= Michigan Tech Huskies football, 2000–2009 =

American college football seasons

2000–2009 Michigan Tech Huskies football
- Conference: Great Lakes Intercollegiate Athletic Conference
- Head coach: Bernie Anderson (1987–2005); Tom Kearly (2006–2016)
- Home stadium: Sherman Field (2000–2009)

The Michigan Tech Huskies football program, 2000–2009 represented Michigan Technological University during the 2000s in NCAA Division II college football as a member of the Great Lakes Intercollegiate Athletic Conference (GLIAC). The team had two head coaches during the decade: Bernie Anderson, who held the post from 1987 to 2005; and Tom Kearly, who served from 2006 to 2016. Highlights of the decade included:

- The 2004 Michigan Tech Huskies football team compiled a 9–1 record and scored 393 points in the regular season, tied for the GLIAC championship, and made the program's first appearance in the NCAA Division II playoffs, losing to North Dakota in the first round.
- The 2008 Michigan Tech Huskies football team compiled an 8–3 record and tied for third place in the GLIAC.

== 2000 ==
2000 Michigan Tech Huskies football
- Conference: Great Lakes Intercollegiate Athletic Conference
- Record: 5–5 (5–5 GLIAC)
- Head coach: Bernie Anderson (14th season)
- Home stadium: Sherman Field

2000 Great Lakes Intercollegiate Athletic Conference football standings
	Conf.			Overall
Team	W		L	W		L
No. 2 Northwood +^	9	–	1	10	–	2
No. 4 Saginaw Valley State +^	9	–	1	9	–	3
Grand Valley State	7	–	3	7	–	4
Northern Michigan	6	–	4	6	–	5
Ashland	5	–	5	6	–	5
Michigan Tech	5	–	5	5	–	5
Ferris State	5	–	5	5	–	6
Wayne State (MI)	4	–	6	4	–	6
Mercyhurst	4	–	6	4	–	7
Hillsdale	2	–	8	3	–	8
Indianapolis	2	–	8	3	–	8
Findlay	2	–	8	2	–	8
+ – Conference co-champions; ^ – NCAA Division II playoff participant; Rankings from AFCA Northeast Region poll

The 2000 Michigan Tech Huskies football team represented Michigan Technological University as a member of the Great Lakes Intercollegiate Athletic Conference (GLIAC) during the 2000 NCAA Division II football season. In their 14th season under head coach Bernie Anderson, the Huskies compiled a 5–5 record (5–5 in conference games), tied for fifth place in the GLIAC, and outscored opponents by a total of 263 to 250.

Quarterback Alex Kowalski, a chemical engineering major, completed 173 of 301 passes for 2,163 yards and 15 touchdowns with a 123.0 quarterback rating. He also led the team in total offense (2,448 yards) and scoring (56 points). Kowalskis also received the Alan Bovard Award as Michigan Tech's most valuable player.

The team's other statistical leaders included wide receiver Jeff Geisz (82 catches for 1,184 yards) and fullback Bryan Weden (565 rushing yards on 122 carries).

=== Schedule ===
Date	Opponent	Rank	Site	Result	Attendance	Source
September 9	Mercyhurst		Sherman Field; Houghton, MI	W 36–29	1,614	
September 16	at Hillsdale		Key Stadium; Indianapolis, IN	W 35–33	1,500	
September 23	at Northern Michigan		Marquette, MI (rivalry)	L 0–24	5,184	
September 30	Hillsdale	No. 10 (Northeast)	Sherman Field; Houghton, MI	W 14–10	1,492	
October 7	No. 5 (Northeast) Northwood	No. 10 (Northeast)	Sherman Field; Houghton, MI	L 33–40	1,780	
October 14	at Ashland		Community Stadium; Ashland, OH	L 28–35	3,500	
October 21	Ferris State		Sherman Field; Houghton, MI	W 34–27	1,135	
October 28	at Grand Valley State		Lubbers Stadium; Allendale, MI	L 29–31	6,026	
November 4	at No. 5 (Northeast) Saginaw Valley State		Wickes Stadium; University Center, MI	L 20–21	3,800	
November 11	Findlay		Sherman Field; Houghton, MI	W 34–0	1,026	
Rankings from AFCA Poll released prior to the game

== 2001 ==
2001 Michigan Tech Huskies football
- Conference: Great Lakes Intercollegiate Athletic Conference
- Record: 5–5 (5–5 GLIAC)
- Head coach: Bernie Anderson (15th season)
- Home stadium: Sherman Field

2001 Great Lakes Intercollegiate Athletic Conference football standings
	Conf.			Overall
Team	W		L	W		L
No. 2 Grand Valley State $^	9	–	0	13	–	1
No. 6 Saginaw Valley State ^	9	–	1	11	–	2
Ferris State	7	–	3	7	–	4
Indianapolis	6	–	4	7	–	4
Ashland	5	–	5	6	–	5
Michigan Tech	5	–	5	5	–	5
Northern Michigan	3	–	7	4	–	7
Northwood	3	–	6	3	–	6
Wayne State (MI)	3	–	6	3	–	7
Findlay	3	–	7	3	–	8
Hillsdale	3	–	7	3	–	8
Mercyhurst	2	–	7	2	–	7
$ – Conference champion; ^ – NCAA Division II playoff participant; Rankings from AFCA poll

The 2001 Michigan Tech Huskies football team represented Michigan Technological University as a member of the Great Lakes Intercollegiate Athletic Conference (GLIAC) during the 2001 NCAA Division II football season. In their 15th season under head coach Bernie Anderson, the Huskies compiled a 5–5 record (5–5 in conference games), tied for fifth place in the GLIAC, and were outscored by a total of 350 to 297.

The team's statistical leaders included:

- Quarterback Brad Spindler - 1,720 passing yards
- Junior Joe Johnson - 1,028 rushing yards, 60 points scored
- Junior Brad Stebel - 49 receptions, 788 yards

=== Schedule ===
Date	Time	Opponent	Site	Result	Attendance	Source
September 8		at Mercyhurst	Tullio Stadium; Erie, PA	W 28–21		
September 15		Indianapolis	Sherman Field; Houghton, MI	L 31–34		
September 22		Northern Michigan	Sherman Field; Houghton, MI (rivalry)	W 33–28		
September 29		at Hillsdale	Frank "Muddy" Waters Stadium; Hillsdale, MI	L 35–52		
October 6	12:00 p.m.	at Northwood	Hantz Stadium; Midland, MI	W 55–33	3,299	
October 13		Ashland	Sherman Field; Houghton, MI	W 45–40		
October 20		at Ferris State	Top Taggart Field; Big Rapids, MI	L 0–35		
October 27		No. 5 Grand Valley State	Sherman Field; Houghton, MI	L 34–44	888	
November 3	11:30 a.m.	at No. 14 Saginaw Valley State	Wickes Stadium; University Center, MI	L 10–40	1,140	
November 10		at Findlay	Donnell Stadium; Findlay, OH	W 26–23		
Rankings from AFCA Poll released prior to the game; All times are in Eastern time

== 2002 ==
2002 Michigan Tech Huskies football
- Conference: Great Lakes Intercollegiate Athletic Conference
- Record: 3–7 (3–7 GLIAC)
- Head coach: Bernie Anderson (16th season)
- Home stadium: Sherman Field

2002 Great Lakes Intercollegiate Athletic Conference football standings
	Conf.			Overall
Team	W		L	W		L
No. 1 Grand Valley State $^	9	–	0	14	–	0
No. 25 Findlay	8	–	2	9	–	2
No. 13 Saginaw Valley State ^	8	–	2	9	–	3
Northwood	7	–	3	7	–	4
Northern Michigan	6	–	4	6	–	5
Ferris State	4	–	5	5	–	5
Indianapolis	4	–	6	5	–	6
Hillsdale	4	–	6	4	–	7
Michigan Tech	3	–	7	3	–	7
Wayne State (MI)	3	–	7	3	–	8
Ashland	2	–	8	2	–	9
Mercyhurst	1	–	9	2	–	9
$ – Conference champion; ^ – NCAA Division II playoff participant; Rankings from AFCA poll

The 2002 Michigan Tech Huskies football team represented Michigan Technological University as a member of the Great Lakes Intercollegiate Athletic Conference (GLIAC) during the 2002 NCAA Division II football season. In their 16th season under head coach Bernie Anderson, the Huskies compiled a 3–7 record (3–6 in conference games), tied for ninth place in the GLIAC, and were outscored by a total of 312 to 229.

=== Schedule ===
Date	Opponent	Site	Result	Attendance	Source
August 31	at Ashland	Ashland, OH	W 30–23		
September 14	at No. 4 Saginaw Valley State	Wickes Stadium; Saginaw, MI	L 21–35	4,734	
September 21	Indianapolis	Sherman Field; Houghton, MI	W 32–24		
September 28	at Findlay	Donnell Stadium; Findlay, OH	L 23–42		
October 5	No. 1 Grand Valley State^{†}	Sherman Field; Houghton, MI	L 14–56	2,056	
October 12	at Ferris State	Top Taggart Field; Big Rapids, MI	L 14–21		
October 19	Wayne State (MI)	Sherman Field; Houghton, MI	L 31–34	1,112	
October 26	at Hillsdale	Frank "Muddy" Waters Stadium; Hillsdale, MI	L 7–31		
November 2	Northern Michigan	Sherman Field; Houghton, MI (Miner's Cup)	W 34–13		
November 9	Northwood	Sherman Field; Houghton, MI	L 23–33	891	
^{†}Homecoming; Rankings from AFCA Poll released prior to the game

== 2003 ==
2003 Michigan Tech Huskies football
- Conference: Great Lakes Intercollegiate Athletic Conference
- Record: 5–5 (5–5 GLIAC)
- Head coach: Bernie Anderson (17th season)
- Home stadium: Sherman Field

2003 Great Lakes Intercollegiate Athletic Conference football standings
	Conf.			Overall
Team	W		L	W		L
No. 4 Saginaw Valley State $^	10	–	0	12	–	1
No. 1 Grand Valley State ^	9	–	1	14	–	1
Northwood	6	–	4	6	–	5
Ferris State	5	–	5	6	–	5
Findlay	5	–	5	6	–	5
Indianapolis	5	–	5	6	–	5
Michigan Tech	5	–	5	5	–	5
Mercyhurst	4	–	6	5	–	6
Hillsdale	4	–	6	4	–	7
Northern Michigan	3	–	7	3	–	8
Wayne State (MI)	2	–	8	3	–	8
Ashland	2	–	8	2	–	9
$ – Conference champion; ^ – NCAA Division II playoff participant; Rankings from AFCA poll

The 2003 Michigan Tech Huskies football team represented Michigan Technological University as a member of the Great Lakes Intercollegiate Athletic Conference (GLIAC) during the 2003 NCAA Division II football season. In their 17th season under head coach Bernie Anderson, the Huskies compiled a 5–5 record (5–5 in conference games), tied for fourth place in the GLIAC, and outscored opponents by a total of 352 to 321.

=== Schedule ===
Date	Opponent	Site	Result	Attendance	Source
August 30	Ashland	Sherman Field; Houghton, MI	W 27–14		
September 13	No. 5 Saginaw Valley State	Sherman Field; Houghton, MI	L 32–34	1,534	
September 20	Hillsdale	Sherman Field; Houghton, MI	L 52–59		
September 27	Findlay	Sherman Field; Houghton, MI	L 28–31		
October 4	at No. 1 Grand Valley State	Lubbers Stadium; Allendale, MI	L 17–48	10,034	
October 11	Ferris State^{†}	Sherman Field; Houghton, MI	W 49–30		
October 18	at Wayne State (MI)	Tom Adams Field; Detroit, MI	W 42–35	1,828	
October 25	Hillsdale	Sherman Field; Houghton, MI	W 47–28		
November 1	at Northern Michigan	Marquette, MI (Miner's Cup)	L 24–35		
November 8	at Northwood	Hantz Stadium; Midland, MI	W 34–7	1,444	
^{†}Homecoming; Rankings from AFCA Poll released prior to the game

== 2004 ==
2004 Michigan Tech Huskies football

GLIAC co-champion

NCAA Division II second round, L 3–20 vs. North Dakota
- Conference: Great Lakes Intercollegiate Athletic Conference
- Record: 9–2 (9–1 GLIAC)
- Head coach: Bernie Anderson (18th season)
- Defensive coordinator: Tim Driscoll (1st season)
- Home stadium: Sherman Field

2004 Great Lakes Intercollegiate Athletic Conference football standings
	Conf.			Overall
Team	W		L	W		L
No. 10 Northwood +^	9	–	1	10	–	2
No. 11 Michigan Tech +^	9	–	1	9	–	2
No. 9 Grand Valley State ^	8	–	2	10	–	3
No. 25 Saginaw Valley State	7	–	3	7	–	3
Ferris State	6	–	4	6	–	5
Findlay	5	–	5	6	–	5
Ashland	4	–	6	5	–	6
Hillsdale	4	–	6	4	–	7
Mercyhurst	4	–	6	4	–	7
Gannon	3	–	7	4	–	7
Indianapolis	3	–	7	4	–	7
Northern Michigan	2	–	8	2	–	8
Wayne State (MI)	1	–	9	1	–	9
+ – Conference co-champions; ^ – NCAA Division II playoff participant; Rankings from AFCA poll

The 2004 Michigan Tech Huskies football team represented Michigan Technological University as a member of the Great Lakes Intercollegiate Athletic Conference (GLIAC) during the 2004 NCAA Division II football season. In their 18th season under head coach Bernie Anderson, the Huskies compiled a 9–2 record (9–1 in conference games), tied with Northwood for the GLIAC championship, and outscored opponents by a total of 396 to 165. Michigan Tech advanced to the NCAA Division II football championship playoffs, where, after a first-round bye, the Huskies lost to North Dakota. Dan Mettlach, who was named the GLIAC’s offensive player of the year, suffered a season-ending ACL injury early in the game versus Grand Valley State University at Michigan Stadium.

The team's statistical leaders included senior quarterback Dan Mettlach (1,985 yards total offense, 144.9 passing efficiency rating), sophomore running back Lee Marana (1,520 rushing yards, 126 points scored), and sophomore wide receiver Kirk Williams (38 receptions, 840 yards).

Seven Michigan Tech players were selected as first-team players on the 2004 GLIAC all-conference football team: Mettlach at quarterback; Marana and Daryl Graham at running back; Joe Berger and Mike Brewster at offensive line; Brian Lepley at defensive line; and Andy Bonk at defensive back. Williams received second-team honors at wide receiver. Other Michigan Tech players receiving second-team honors were David Kopke (offensive line) and Dustin Daniels (linebacker).

=== Schedule ===
Date	Opponent	Rank	Site	Result	Attendance	Source
August 28	Northern Michigan		Sherman Field; Houghton, MI (Miner's Cup)	W 45–6	4,332	
September 4	Indianapolis		Sherman Field; Houghton, MI	W 17–10		
September 11	Mercyhurst		Sherman Field; Houghton, MI	W 54–13		
September 25	at Ashland		Ashland, OH	W 51–14		
October 2	at Gannon	No. 22	Erie, PA	W 38–24		
October 9	Wayne State (MI)^{†}	No. 17	Sherman Field; Houghton, MI	W 61–23	2,775	
October 16	No. 7 Northwood	No. 13	Sherman Field; Houghton, MI	W 54–7	2,378	
October 23	at Ferris State	No. 8	Top Taggart Field; Big Rapids, MI	W 28–6		
October 30	No. 16 Saginaw Valley State	No. 7	Sherman Field; Houghton, MI	W 38–18	2,912	
November 6	vs. No. 17 Grand Valley State	No. 4	Michigan Stadium; Ann Arbor, MI	L 7–24	50,123	
November 20	No. 14 North Dakota*	No. 9	Sherman Field; Houghton, MI (NCAA Division II second round)	L 3–20	1,812	
*Non-conference game; ^{†}Homecoming; Rankings from American Football Coaches Association Poll released prior to the game

== 2005 ==
2005 Michigan Tech Huskies football
- Conference: Great Lakes Intercollegiate Athletic Conference
- Record: 6–3 (6–3 GLIAC)
- Head coach: Bernie Anderson (19th season)
- Defensive coordinator: Tim Driscoll (2nd season)
- Home stadium: Sherman Field

2005 Great Lakes Intercollegiate Athletic Conference football standings
	Conf.			Overall
Team	W		L	W		L
No. 1 Grand Valley State $^	9	–	0	13	–	0
No. 3 Saginaw Valley State * ^	9	–	1	11	–	2
No. 18 Northwood ^	8	–	2	9	–	3
Ashland	8	–	2	9	–	2
Michigan Tech	6	–	3	6	–	3
Indianapolis	5	–	5	6	–	5
Hillsdale	4	–	6	5	–	6
Wayne State (MI)	3	–	7	3	–	7
Ferris State	3	–	7	3	–	8
Gannon	3	–	7	3	–	8
Findlay	2	–	8	3	–	8
Mercyhurst	2	–	8	2	–	8
Northern Michigan	2	–	8	2	–	8
$ – Conference champion; ^ – NCAA Division II playoff participant; * – Saginaw Valley State forfeited all wins, giving all other GLIAC teams except Grand Valley State, Ashland, and Gannon one more official win than shown.; Rankings from AFCA poll

The 2005 Michigan Tech Huskies football team represented Michigan Technological University as a member of the Great Lakes Intercollegiate Athletic Conference (GLIAC) during the 2005 NCAA Division II football season. In their 19th season under head coach Bernie Anderson, the Huskies compiled a 6–3 record (6–3 in conference games), finished in fifth place in the GLIAC, and were outscored by a total of 232 to 163.

=== Schedule ===
Date	Opponent	Rank	Site	Result	Attendance	Source
August 27	at Northern Michigan	No. 24	Superior Dome; Marquette, MI (Miner's Cup)	W 42–21		
September 3	Indianapolis	No. 19	Sherman Field; Houghton, MI	W 24–6		
September 10	at Mercyhurst	No. 18	Tullio Stadium; Erie, PA	W 24–20		
September 24	Ashland^{†}	No. 15	Sherman Field; Houghton, MI	W 17–14	3,215	
October 1	Gannon	No. 13	Sherman Field; Houghton, MI	W 45–17	3,147	
October 8	at Wayne State (MI)	No. 9	Tom Adams Field; Detroit, MI	L 14–25	2,805	
October 15	at No. 11 Northwood	No. 19	Hantz Stadium; Midland, MI	L 21–24	2,922	
October 22	Ferris State	No. 25	Sherman Field; Houghton, MI	W 35–19		
October 29	at No. 7 Saginaw Valley State		Wickes Stadium; University Center, MI	L 10–17	5,346	
November 5	at No. 1 Grand Valley State		Lubbers Stadium; Allendale, MI	Canceled		
^{†}Homecoming; Rankings from AFCA Poll released prior to the game

== 2006 ==
2006 Michigan Tech Huskies football
- Conference: Great Lakes Intercollegiate Athletic Conference
- Record: 6–4 (6–4 GLIAC)
- Head coach: Tom Kearly (1st season)
- Defensive coordinator: Tim Driscoll (3rd season)
- Home stadium: Sherman Field

2006 Great Lakes Intercollegiate Athletic Conference football standings
	Conf.			Overall
Team	W		L	W		L
No. 1 Grand Valley State $^	10	–	0	15	–	0
No. 18 Northwood ^	8	–	2	8	–	3
Ferris State	7	–	3	8	–	3
Michigan Tech	6	–	4	6	–	4
Saginaw Valley State	6	–	4	6	–	4
Wayne State (MI)	6	–	4	6	–	5
Indianapolis	5	–	5	6	–	5
Hillsdale	5	–	5	5	–	6
Ashland	4	–	6	4	–	6
Mercyhurst	3	–	7	3	–	7
Northern Michigan	3	–	7	3	–	7
Findlay	1	–	9	2	–	9
Gannon	1	–	9	1	–	10
$ – Conference champion; ^ – NCAA Division II playoff participant; Rankings from AFCA poll

The 2006 Michigan Tech Huskies football team represented Michigan Technological University as a member of the Great Lakes Intercollegiate Athletic Conference (GLIAC) during the 2006 NCAA Division II football season. In their first season under head coach Tom Kearly, the Huskies compiled a 6–4 record (6–4 in conference games), tied for fourth place in the GLIAC, and outscored opponents by a total of 236 to 192.

=== Schedule ===
Date	Opponent	Site	Result	Attendance	Source
September 2	Wayne State (MI)	Sherman Field; Houghton, MI	L 14–36	2,977	
September 9	at Indianapolis	Key Stadium; Indianapolis, IN	L 31–34		
September 16	No. 18 Northwood	Sherman Field; Houghton, MI	L 7–13	2,020	
September 21	No. 1 Grand Valley State	Lubbers Stadium; Allendale, MI	L 20–41	10,209	
September 30	Hillsdale	Sherman Field; Houghton, MI	W 14–12		
October 7	at Ferris State	Top Taggart Field; Big Rapids, MI	W 41–7		
October 14	No. 23 Saginaw Valley State	Sherman Field; Houghton, MI	W 20–7	2,011	
October 21	Northern Michigan	Sherman Field; Houghton, MI (Miner's Cup)	W 42–14		
October 28	at Gannon	Gannon University Field; Erie, PA	W 14–13		
November 11	at Findlay	Donnell Stadium; Findlay, OH	W 33–15		
Rankings from AFCA Poll released prior to the game

== 2007 ==
2007 Michigan Tech Huskies football
- Conference: Great Lakes Intercollegiate Athletic Conference
- Record: 6–5 (6–4 GLIAC)
- Head coach: Tom Kearly (2nd season)
- Defensive coordinator: Tim Driscoll (4th season)
- Home stadium: Sherman Field

2007 Great Lakes Intercollegiate Athletic Conference football standings
	Conf.			Overall
Team	W		L	W		L
No. 4 Grand Valley State $^	9	–	0	12	–	1
No. 22 Ashland ^	8	–	1	8	–	2
Hillsdale	7	–	3	8	–	3
Saginaw Valley State *	7	–	3	7	–	3
Michigan Tech	6	–	4	6	–	5
Ferris State	5	–	5	6	–	5
Indianapolis	5	–	5	6	–	5
Northwood	5	–	5	5	–	5
Northern Michigan	4	–	6	4	–	6
Findlay	3	–	7	4	–	7
Mercyhurst	3	–	7	4	–	7
Wayne State (MI)	2	–	8	3	–	8
Gannon	0	–	10	0	–	11
$ – Conference champion; ^ – NCAA Division II playoff participant; * – Saginaw Valley State forfeited wins against Gannon, Ferris State, Northern Michigan, and Findlay.; Rankings from AFCA poll

The 2007 Michigan Tech Huskies football team represented Michigan Technological University as a member of the Great Lakes Intercollegiate Athletic Conference (GLIAC) during the 2007 NCAA Division II football season. In their second season under head coach Tom Kearly, the Huskies compiled a 6–5 record (6–4 in conference games), finisheed fifth in the GLIAC, and outscored opponents by a total of 331 to 313.

=== Schedule ===
Date	Opponent	Site	Result	Attendance	Source
August 25	at Winona State*	Wireless Stadium; Winona, MN	L 44–47		
September 1	at Wayne State (MI)	Tom Adams Field; Detroit, MI	W 21–14	2,656	
September 8	Indianapolis	Sherman Field; Houghton, MI	W 44–30		
September 15	at No. 13 Northwood	Hantz Stadium; Midland, MI	W 43–41	2,407	
September 22	No. 1 Grand Valley State	Sherman Field; Houghton, MI	L 6–48	3,687	
September 29	at Hillsdale	Frank "Muddy" Waters Stadium; Hillsdale, MI	L 0–37		
October 6	Ferris State^{†}	Sherman Field; Houghton, MI	W 40–12		
October 13	at Saginaw Valley State	Wickes Stadium; University Center, MI	L 16–33	3,962	
October 20	at Northern Michigan	Superior Dome; Marquette, MI (Miner's Cup)	L 27–34		
October 27	Gannon	Sherman Field; Houghton, MI	W 56–7		
November 10	Findlay	Sherman Field; Houghton, MI	W 34–10		
*Non-conference game; ^{†}Homecoming; Rankings from AFCA Poll released prior to the game

== 2008 ==
2008 Michigan Tech Huskies football
- Conference: Great Lakes Intercollegiate Athletic Conference
- Record: 8–3 (7–3 GLIAC)
- Head coach: Tom Kearly (3rd season)
- Defensive coordinator: Tim Driscoll (5th season)
- Home stadium: Sherman Field

2008 Great Lakes Intercollegiate Athletic Conference football standings
	Conf.			Overall
Team	W		L	W		L
No. 4 Grand Valley State $^	10	–	0	11	–	1
No. 15 Ashland ^	8	–	2	9	–	4
Michigan Tech	7	–	3	8	–	3
Wayne State (MI)	7	–	3	8	–	3
Saginaw Valley State	7	–	3	7	–	3
Hillsdale	6	–	4	7	–	4
Ferris State	5	–	5	6	–	5
Indianapolis	4	–	6	5	–	6
Northern Michigan	2	–	8	2	–	8
Northwood	2	–	8	2	–	8
Findlay	1	–	9	2	–	9
Tiffin	1	–	9	1	–	10
+ – Conference co-champions; ^ – NCAA Division II playoff participant; Rankings from AFCA poll

The 2008 Michigan Tech Huskies football team represented Michigan Technological University as a member of the Great Lakes Intercollegiate Athletic Conference (GLIAC) during the 2008 NCAA Division II football season. In their third season under head coach Tom Kearly, the Huskies compiled a 8–3 record (7–3 in conference games), tied for third place in the GLIAC, and were outscored by a total of 322 to 321.

=== Schedule ===
Date	Time	Opponent	Site	Result	Attendance	Source
August 30		Winona State*	Sherman Field; Houghton, MI	W 26–21	2,955	
September 6		Hillsdale	Sherman Field; Houghton, MI	W 39–36		
September 13		Ashland	Sherman Field; Houghton, MI	L 41–48		
September 18		at Northern Michigan	Superior Dome; Marquette, MI (Miner's Cup)	W 47–21		
September 27	7:00 p.m.	at No. 2 Grand Valley State	Lubbers Stadium; Allendale, MI	L 6–52	12,405	
October 4	1:00 p.m.	No. 25 Ferris State^{†}	Sherman Field; Houghton, MI	W 21–7	2,989	
October 11		at Findlay	Donnell Stadium; Findlay, OH	W 30–28		
October 18		Indianapolis	Sherman Field; Houghton, MI	W 31–28		
October 25		at Saginaw Valley State	Wickes Stadium; University Center, MI	L 23–40	4,037	
November 1		Tiffin	Sherman Field; Houghton, MI	W 32–28		
November 8	12:00 p.m.	at Northwood	Hantz Stadium; Midland, MI	W 25–13	1,012	
*Non-conference game; ^{†}Homecoming; Rankings from AFCA Poll released prior to the game; All times are in Eastern time

== 2009 ==
2009 Michigan Tech Huskies football
- Conference: Great Lakes Intercollegiate Athletic Conference
- Record: 2–8 (2–8 GLIAC)
- Head coach: Tom Kearly (4th season)
- Offensive coordinator: Erik Ieuter (1st season)
- Defensive coordinator: Tim Driscoll (6th season)
- Home stadium: Sherman Field

2009 Great Lakes Intercollegiate Athletic Conference football standings
	Conf.			Overall
Team	W		L	W		L
No. 2 Grand Valley State $^	9	–	1	13	–	2
No. 11 Hillsdale ^	8	–	2	10	–	3
No. 19 Saginaw Valley State ^	8	–	2	9	–	3
Northwood	7	–	3	7	–	3
Findlay	6	–	4	7	–	4
Northern Michigan	6	–	4	6	–	4
Ashland	6	–	4	6	–	5
Wayne State (MI)	5	–	5	6	–	5
Indianapolis	3	–	7	4	–	7
Michigan Tech	2	–	8	2	–	8
Ferris State	0	–	10	1	–	10
Tiffin	0	–	10	0	–	11
$ – Conference champion; ^ – NCAA Division II playoff participant; Rankings from AFCA poll

The 2009 Michigan Tech Huskies football team represented Michigan Technological University as a member of the Great Lakes Intercollegiate Athletic Conference (GLIAC) during the 2009 NCAA Division II football season. In their fourth season under head coach Tom Kearly, the Huskies compiled a 2–8 record (2–8 in conference games), finished in tenth place in the GLIAC, and were outscored by a total of 322 to 224.

=== Schedule ===
Date	Time	Opponent	Site	Result	Attendance	Source
September 5	12:00 p.m.	at Hillsdale	Waters Stadium; Hillsdale, MI	L 35–37	1,799	
September 12	1:00 p.m.	at No. 19 Ashland	Jack Miller Stadium; Ashland, OH	L 28–34	4,496	
September 19	1:00 p.m.	Northern Michigan	Sherman Field; Houghton, MI (Miner's Cup)	L 16–48	4,027	
September 26	6:00 p.m.	No. 1 Grand Valley State	Sherman Field; Houghton, MI	L 7–55	2,339	
October 3	7:00 p.m.	vs. Ferris State	Fifth Third Ballpark; Comstock Park, MI (Battle at the Ballpark)	W 38–6	2,964	
October 10	1:00 p.m.	Findlay^{†}	Sherman Field; Houghton, MI	L 5–14	1,959	
October 17	6:00 p.m.	at Indianapolis	Key Stadium; Indianapolis, IN	L 20–38	1,977	
October 24	1:00 p.m.	No. 24 Saginaw Valley State	Sherman Field; Houghton, MI	L 28–38	1,522	
October 31	1:30 p.m.	at Tiffin	Frost-Kalnow Stadium; Tiffin, OH	W 21–14	312	
November 7	1:00 p.m.	Northwood	Sherman Field; Houghton, MI	L 26–38	1,845	
^{†}Homecoming; Rankings from American Football Coaches Association Poll released prior to the game; All times are in Eastern time
