= Saginaw Valley State Cardinals football, 2000–2009 =

American college football season

2000–2009 Saginaw Valley State Cardinals football
- Conference: Great Lakes Intercollegiate Athletic Conference
- Head coach: Randy Awrey (1999–2007); Jim Collins (2008–2018)
- Home stadium: Harvey Randall Wickes Memorial Stadium

The Saginaw Valley State Cardinals football program, 2000–2009 represented Saginaw Valley State University during the 2000s in NCAA Division II college football as a member of the Great Lakes Intercollegiate Athletic Conference (GLIAC). The team was led during the decade by two head coaches: Randy Awrey (1999–2007); and Jim Collins (2008–2018).

The team played its home games at Harvey Randall Wickes Memorial Stadium, commonly shortened to Wickes Stadium, in University Center, Michigan.

== Decade overview ==
Year	Head coach	Overall record	Conf. record	Conf. rank	Points scored	Points against	Delta
2000	Randy Awrey	9–3	9–1	2	366	316	+50
2001	Randy Awrey	11–2	9–1	2	381	256	+125
2002	Randy Awrey	9–3	8–2	2 (tie)	479	224	+255
2003	Randy Awrey	12–1	10–0	1	437	187	+250
2004	Randy Awrey	7–3	7–3	4	354	177	+177
2005	Randy Awrey	11–2	9–0	2	344	191	+153
2006	Randy Awrey	6–4	6–4	4 (tie)	269	241	+28
2007	Randy Awrey	7–3	7–3	3 (tie)	292	206	+86
2008	Jim Collins	7–3	7–3	3 (tie)	262	224	+38
2009	Jim Collins	9–3	8–2	2 (tie)	342	252	+90
TOTAL		88–27	80–19				

== 2000 ==
2000 Saginaw Valley State Cardinals football
- Conference: Great Lakes Intercollegiate Athletic Conference

Ranking
- AFCA: No. 4 (Northeast Region)
- Record: 9–3 (9–1 GLIAC)
- Head coach: Randy Awrey (2nd season)
- Home stadium: Harvey Randall Wickes Memorial Stadium

2000 Great Lakes Intercollegiate Athletic Conference football standings
	Conf.			Overall
Team	W		L	W		L
No. 2 Northwood +^	9	–	1	10	–	2
No. 4 Saginaw Valley State +^	9	–	1	9	–	3
Grand Valley State	7	–	3	7	–	4
Northern Michigan	6	–	4	6	–	5
Ashland	5	–	5	6	–	5
Michigan Tech	5	–	5	5	–	5
Ferris State	5	–	5	5	–	6
Wayne State (MI)	4	–	6	4	–	6
Mercyhurst	4	–	6	4	–	7
Hillsdale	2	–	8	3	–	8
Indianapolis	2	–	8	3	–	8
Findlay	2	–	8	2	–	8
+ – Conference co-champions; ^ – NCAA Division II playoff participant; Rankings from AFCA Northeast Region poll

The 2000 Saginaw Valley State Cardinals football team represented Saginaw Valley State University (SVSU) as a member of the Great Lakes Intercollegiate Athletic Conference (GLIAC) during the 2000 NCAA Division II football season. In their second year under head coach Randy Awrey, the Cardinals compiled a 9–3 record (9–1 in conference games), finished in second place in the GLIAC, and outscored opponents by a total of 366 to 316.

=== Schedule ===
Date	Opponent	Rank	Site	Result	Attendance	Source
August 31	at Hillsdale		Frank "Muddy" Waters Stadium; Hillsdale, MI	L 19–21	2,551	
September 9	Grand Valley State		Wickes Stadium; University Center, MI (Battle of the Valleys)	W 28–21	3,700	
September 16	at Ferris State		Top Taggart Field; Big Rapids, MI	W 39–36	4,329	
September 23	Indianapolis		Wickes Stadium; University Center, MI	W 46–34	2,400	
September 30	at Ashland	No. 9 (Northeast)	Community Stadium; Ashland, OH	W 42–35 ^{OT}	2,500	
October 7	at Mercyhurst	No. 8 (Northeast)	Tullio Field; Erie, PA	W 46–40	775	
October 14	No. 4 (Northeast) Northwood	No. 6 (Northeast)	Wickes Stadium; University Center, MI (Axe Bowl)	L 3–17	7,500	
October 21	at Wayne State (MI)	No. 8 (Northeast)	Tom Adams Field; Detroit, MI	W 31–19	1,649	
October 28	Findlay	No. 8 (Northeast)	Wickes Stadium; University Center, MI	W 31–6	2,400	
November 4	Michigan Tech	No. 5 (Northeast)	Wickes Stadium; University Center, MI	W 21–20	3,800	
November 11	at Northern Michigan	No. 4 (Northeast)	Superior Dome; Marquette, MI	W 28–21	3,017	
November 18	at Bloomsburg		Bloomsburg, PA	L 32–46	1,435	
Rankings from AFCA Poll released prior to the game

== 2001 ==
2001 Saginaw Valley State Cardinals football

NCAA Division II quarterfinal, L 30–33 vs. Grand Valley State
- Conference: Great Lakes Intercollegiate Athletic Conference

Ranking
- AFCA: No. 6
- Record: 11–2 (9–1 GLIAC)
- Head coach: Randy Awrey (3rd season)
- Home stadium: Harvey Randall Wickes Memorial Stadium

2001 Great Lakes Intercollegiate Athletic Conference football standings
	Conf.			Overall
Team	W		L	W		L
No. 2 Grand Valley State $^	9	–	0	13	–	1
No. 6 Saginaw Valley State ^	9	–	1	11	–	2
Ferris State	7	–	3	7	–	4
Indianapolis	6	–	4	7	–	4
Ashland	5	–	5	6	–	5
Michigan Tech	5	–	5	5	–	5
Northern Michigan	3	–	7	4	–	7
Northwood	3	–	6	3	–	6
Wayne State (MI)	3	–	6	3	–	7
Findlay	3	–	7	3	–	8
Hillsdale	3	–	7	3	–	8
Mercyhurst	2	–	7	2	–	7
$ – Conference champion; ^ – NCAA Division II playoff participant; Rankings from AFCA poll

The 2001 Saginaw Valley State Cardinals football team represented Saginaw Valley State University (SVSU) as a member of the Great Lakes Intercollegiate Athletic Conference (GLIAC) during the 2001 NCAA Division II football season. In their third year under head coach Randy Awrey, the Cardinals compiled an 11–2 record (9–1 in conference games), finished in second place in the GLIAC, and outscored opponents by a total of 381 to 256.

=== Schedule ===
Date	Time	Opponent	Rank	Site	Result	Attendance	Source
September 1		Hillsdale	No. 24	Wickes Stadium; University Center, MI	W 31–21	3,982	
September 8		at No. 18 Grand Valley State		Lubbers Stadium; Allendale, MI (Battle of the Valleys)	L 7–38	5,303	
September 15	12:00 p.m.	Ferris State		Wickes Stadium; University Center, MI	W 33–20	6,813	
September 22		at Indianapolis		Indianapolis, IN	W 17–14	4,000	
September 29		Ashland		Wickes Stadium; University Center, MI	W 20–3	3,974	
October 6		Mercyhurst	No. 24	Wickes Stadium; University Center, MI	W 28–21	4,053	
October 13	12:00 p.m.	at Northwood	No. 21	Midland, MI (Axe Bowl)	W 24–21	2,629	
October 20		Wayne State (MI)	No. 21	Wickes Stadium; University Center, MI	W 45–12	3,841	
October 27		at Findlay	No. 17	Donnell Stadium; Findlay, OH	W 49–21	1,370	
November 3	11:30 a.m.	at Michigan Tech	No. 14	Houghton, MI	W 40–10	1,140	
November 10		Northern Michigan	No. 12	Wickes Stadium; University Center, MI	W 24–10	3,724	
November 17		No. 8 Indiana (PA)*	No. 9	Wickes Stadium; University Center, MI (NCAA Division II first round)	W 33–32	3,541	
November 24		at No. 2 Grand Valley State*	No. 9	Lubbers Stadium; Allendale, MI (NCAA Division II quarterfinal)	L 30–33	3,737	
*Non-conference game; Rankings from American Football Coaches Association Poll released prior to the game; All times are in Eastern time

== 2002 ==
2002 Saginaw Valley State Cardinals football

NCAA Division II first round, L 23–27 at IUP
- Conference: Great Lakes Intercollegiate Athletic Conference

Ranking
- AFCA: No. 13
- Record: 9–3 (8–2 GLIAC)
- Head coach: Randy Awrey (4th season)
- Home stadium: Harvey Randall Wickes Memorial Stadium

2002 Great Lakes Intercollegiate Athletic Conference football standings
	Conf.			Overall
Team	W		L	W		L
No. 1 Grand Valley State $^	9	–	0	14	–	0
No. 25 Findlay	8	–	2	9	–	2
No. 13 Saginaw Valley State ^	8	–	2	9	–	3
Northwood	7	–	3	7	–	4
Northern Michigan	6	–	4	6	–	5
Ferris State	4	–	5	5	–	5
Indianapolis	4	–	6	5	–	6
Hillsdale	4	–	6	4	–	7
Michigan Tech	3	–	7	3	–	7
Wayne State (MI)	3	–	7	3	–	8
Ashland	2	–	8	2	–	9
Mercyhurst	1	–	9	2	–	9
$ – Conference champion; ^ – NCAA Division II playoff participant; Rankings from AFCA poll

The 2002 Saginaw Valley State Cardinals football team represented Saginaw Valley State University (SVSU) as a member of the Great Lakes Intercollegiate Athletic Conference (GLIAC) during the 2002 NCAA Division II football season. In their fourth year under head coach Randy Awrey, the Cardinals compiled a 9–3 record (8–2 in conference games), tied for second place in the GLIAC, and outscored opponents by a total of 479 to 224.

=== Schedule ===
Date	Opponent	Rank	Site	Result	Attendance	Source
September 7	Northwood	No. 8	Wickes Stadium; University Center, MI (Axe Bowl)	W 47–13	7,688	
September 14	Michigan Tech	No. 4	Wickes Stadium; University Center, MI	W 35–21	4,734	
September 21	Mercyhurst	No. 4	Wickes Stadium; University Center, MI	W 51–7	3,296	
September 28	at Ashland	No. 4	Ashland, OH	W 52–20	1,750	
October 5	Indianapolis	No. 4	Wickes Stadium; University Center, MI	W 63–24	4,536	
October 12	at No. 20 Findlay	No. 4	Donnell Stadium; Findlay, OH	W 69–7	3,002	
October 19	No. 1 Grand Valley State	No. 3	Wickes Stadium; University Center, MI (Battle of the Valleys)	L 18–23	11,234	
October 26	at Ferris State	No. 9	Top Taggart Field; Big Rapids, MI	L 3–24	2,263	
November 2	Hillsdale	No. 18	Wickes Stadium; University Center, MI	W 48–20	2,138	
November 9	at Northern Michigan	No. 16	Superior Dome; Marquette MI	W 28–24	3,571	
November 16	at Wayne State (MI)	No. 15	Tom Adams Field; Detroit, MI	W 42–14	2,424	
November 23	at No. 6 IUP*	No. 15	Indiana, PA (NCAA Division II first round)	L 23–27	2,289	
*Non-conference game; Rankings from AFCA Poll released prior to the game

== 2003 ==
2003 Saginaw Valley State Cardinals football

GLIAC champion

NCAA Division II quarterfinal, L 3–10 vs. Grand Valley State
- Conference: Great Lakes Intercollegiate Athletic Conference

Ranking
- AFCA: No. 4
- Record: 12–1 (10–0 GLIAC)
- Head coach: Randy Awrey (5th season)
- Home stadium: Harvey Randall Wickes Memorial Stadium

2003 Great Lakes Intercollegiate Athletic Conference football standings
	Conf.			Overall
Team	W		L	W		L
No. 4 Saginaw Valley State $^	10	–	0	12	–	1
No. 1 Grand Valley State ^	9	–	1	14	–	1
Northwood	6	–	4	6	–	5
Ferris State	5	–	5	6	–	5
Findlay	5	–	5	6	–	5
Indianapolis	5	–	5	6	–	5
Michigan Tech	5	–	5	5	–	5
Mercyhurst	4	–	6	5	–	6
Hillsdale	4	–	6	4	–	7
Northern Michigan	3	–	7	3	–	8
Wayne State (MI)	2	–	8	3	–	8
Ashland	2	–	8	2	–	9
$ – Conference champion; ^ – NCAA Division II playoff participant; Rankings from AFCA poll

The 2003 Saginaw Valley State Cardinals football team represented Saginaw Valley State University (SVSU) as a member of the Great Lakes Intercollegiate Athletic Conference (GLIAC) during the 2003 NCAA Division II football season. In their fourth year under head coach Randy Awrey, the Cardinals compiled a 12–1 record (10–0 in conference games), won the GLIAC championship, and outscored opponents by a total of 437 to 187. They participated in the NCAA Division II playoffs, losing to national champion Grand Valley State in the quarterfinals.

=== Schedule ===
Date	Time	Opponent	Rank	Site	Result	Attendance	Source
September 6	12:00 p.m.	Northwood	No. 7	Wickes Stadium; University Center MI (Axe Bowl)	W 30–14	6,131	
September 13		at Michigan Tech	No. 5	Sherman Field; Houghton, MI	W 34–32	1,534	
September 20		at Mercyhurst	No. 6	Tullio Field; Erie, PA	W 26–3	2,317	
September 27		Ashland	No. 6	Wickes Stadium; University Center MI	W 38–0	3,331	
October 4		at Indianapolis	No. 6	Key Stadium; Indianapolis, IN	W 55–3	3,500	
October 11		No. 25 Findlay	No. 6	Wickes Stadium; University Center MI	W 35–7	4,761	
October 18	7:00 p.m.	at No. 1 Grand Valley State	No. 5	Lubbers Stadium; Allendale, MI (Battle of the Valleys)	W 34–20	12,832	
October 25	12:00 p.m.	Ferris State	No. 2	Wickes Stadium; University Center MI	W 38–31	5,175	
November 1		at Hillsdale	No. 2	Frank "Muddy" Waters Stadium; Hillsdale, MI	W 31–22	1,970	
November 8		Northern Michigan	No. 1	Wickes Stadium; University Center MI	W 42–15	4,459	
November 15	12:00 p.m.	Wayne State (MI)	No. 1	Wickes Stadium; University Center MI	W 38–21	3,873	
November 22		No. 18 Edinboro*	No. 1	Wickes Stadium; University Center MI (NCAA Division II first round)	W 33–9	3,907	
November 29	12:00 p.m.	No. 4 Grand Valley State*	No. 1	Wickes Stadium; University Center MI (NCAA Division II quarterfinals)	L 3–10	9,267	
*Non-conference game; Rankings from AFCA Poll released prior to the game; All times are in Eastern time

== 2004 ==
2004 Saginaw Valley State Cardinals football
- Conference: Great Lakes Intercollegiate Athletic Conference

Ranking
- AFCA: No. 25
- Record: 7–3 (7–2 GLIAC)
- Head coach: Randy Awrey (6th season)
- Home stadium: Harvey Randall Wickes Memorial Stadium

2004 Great Lakes Intercollegiate Athletic Conference football standings
	Conf.			Overall
Team	W		L	W		L
No. 10 Northwood +^	9	–	1	10	–	2
No. 11 Michigan Tech +^	9	–	1	9	–	2
No. 9 Grand Valley State ^	8	–	2	10	–	3
No. 25 Saginaw Valley State	7	–	3	7	–	3
Ferris State	6	–	4	6	–	5
Findlay	5	–	5	6	–	5
Ashland	4	–	6	5	–	6
Hillsdale	4	–	6	4	–	7
Mercyhurst	4	–	6	4	–	7
Gannon	3	–	7	4	–	7
Indianapolis	3	–	7	4	–	7
Northern Michigan	2	–	8	2	–	8
Wayne State (MI)	1	–	9	1	–	9
+ – Conference co-champions; ^ – NCAA Division II playoff participant; Rankings from AFCA poll

The 2004 Saginaw Valley State Cardinals football team represented Saginaw Valley State University (SVSU) as a member of the Great Lakes Intercollegiate Athletic Conference (GLIAC) during the 2004 NCAA Division II football season. In their sixth year under head coach Randy Awrey, the Cardinals compiled a 7–3 record (7–3 in conference games), finished in fourth place in the GLIAC, and outscored opponents by a total of 354 to 177.

=== Schedule ===
Date	Opponent	Rank	Site	Result	Attendance	Source
August 28	No. 25 Northwood	No. 18	Wickes Stadium; University Center, MI (Axe Bowl)	L 21–24	4,781	
September 11	at Wayne State (MI)	No. 17	Tom Adams Field; Detroit, MI	W 45–0	2,067	
September 18	at Findlay	No. 14	Donnell Stadium; Findlay, OH	W 38–24	2,230	
September 25	Hillsdale	No. 13	Wickes Stadium; University Center, MI	W 35–14	3,726	
October 2	Indianapolis	No. 13	Wickes Stadium; University Center, MI	W 62–14	4,239	
October 9	at Mercyhurst	No. 13	Tullio Field; Erie, PA	L 15–22	1,775	
October 16	No. 1 Grand Valley State	No. 23	Wickes Stadium; University Center, MI (Battle of the Valleys)	W 31–20	6,325	
October 23	Northern Michigan	No. 19	Wickes Stadium; University Center, MI	W 42–7	3,207	
October 30	at No. 7 Michigan Tech	No. 16	Sherman Field; Houghton, MI	L 18–38	2,912	
November 6	at Ferris State	No. 25	Top Taggart Field; Big Rapids, MI	W 47–14	1,899	
Rankings from American Football Coaches Association Poll released prior to the game

== 2005 ==
2005 Saginaw Valley State Cardinals football

NCAA Division II quarterfinal, L 17–24 vs. Grand Valley State
- Conference: Great Lakes Intercollegiate Athletic Conference

Ranking
- AFCA: No. 3
- Record: 11–2 (9–1 GLIAC)
- Head coach: Randy Awrey (7th season)
- Home stadium: Harvey Randall Wickes Memorial Stadium

2005 Great Lakes Intercollegiate Athletic Conference football standings
	Conf.			Overall
Team	W		L	W		L
No. 1 Grand Valley State $^	9	–	0	13	–	0
No. 3 Saginaw Valley State * ^	9	–	1	11	–	2
No. 18 Northwood ^	8	–	2	9	–	3
Ashland	8	–	2	9	–	2
Michigan Tech	6	–	3	6	–	3
Indianapolis	5	–	5	6	–	5
Hillsdale	4	–	6	5	–	6
Wayne State (MI)	3	–	7	3	–	7
Ferris State	3	–	7	3	–	8
Gannon	3	–	7	3	–	8
Findlay	2	–	8	3	–	8
Mercyhurst	2	–	8	2	–	8
Northern Michigan	2	–	8	2	–	8
$ – Conference champion; ^ – NCAA Division II playoff participant; * – Saginaw Valley State forfeited all wins, giving all other GLIAC teams except Grand Valley State, Ashland, and Gannon one more official win than shown.; Rankings from AFCA poll

The 2005 Saginaw Valley State Cardinals football team represented Saginaw Valley State University (SVSU) as a member of the Great Lakes Intercollegiate Athletic Conference (GLIAC) during the 2005 NCAA Division II football season. In their seventh year under head coach Randy Awrey, the Cardinals compiled an 11–2 record (9–1 in conference games), finished in second place in the GLIAC, and outscored opponents by a total of 344 to 191. The Carindals lost twice to Division II national champion Grand Valley State.

=== Schedule ===
Date	Opponent	Rank	Site	Result	Attendance	Source
August 27	at No. 10 Northwood	No. 21	Hantz Stadium; Midland, MI (Axe Bowl)	W 9–7	4,292	
September 10	Wayne State (MI)	No. 12	Wickes Stadium; University Center, MI	W 29–3	3,750	
September 17	Findlay	No. 11	Wickes Stadium; University Center, MI	W 42–3	4,666	
September 24	at Hillsdale	No. 9	Frank "Muddy" Waters Stadium; Hillsdale, MI	W 24–3	1,825	
October 1	at Indianapolis	No. 6	Key Stadium; Indianapolis, IN	W 27–7	3,370	
October 8	Mercyhurst	No. 4	Wickes Stadium; University Center, MI	W 44–14	4,100	
October 15	at No. 1 Grand Valley State	No. 4	Lubbers Stadium; Allendale, MI (Battle of the Valleys)	L 10–31	14,472	
October 22	at Northern Michigan	No. 11	Superior Dome; Marquette, MI	W 31–20	3,613	
October 29	Michigan Tech	No. 7	Wickes Stadium; University Center, MI	W 17–10	5,346	
November 5	Ferris State	No. 6	Wickes Stadium; University Center, MI	W 39–32	3,977	
November 12	No. 10 Northwood*	No. 4	Wickes Stadium; University Center, MI (NCAA Division II first round	W 31–16	4,300	
November 19	at No. 16 Nebraska–Omaha*	No. 3	Al F. Caniglia Field; Omaha, NE (NCAA Division II second round)	W 24–21	4,357	
November 26	at No. 1 Grand Valley State*	No. 3	Lubbers Stadium; Allendale, MI (NCAA Division II quarterfinal)	L 17–24	5,364	
*Non-conference game; Rankings from American Football Coaches Association Poll released prior to the game

== 2006 ==
2006 Saginaw Valley State Cardinals football
- Conference: Great Lakes Intercollegiate Athletic Conference
- Record: 6–4 (6–4 GLIAC)
- Head coach: Randy Awrey (8th season)
- Home stadium: Harvey Randall Wickes Memorial Stadium

2006 Great Lakes Intercollegiate Athletic Conference football standings
	Conf.			Overall
Team	W		L	W		L
No. 1 Grand Valley State $^	10	–	0	15	–	0
No. 18 Northwood ^	8	–	2	8	–	3
Ferris State	7	–	3	8	–	3
Michigan Tech	6	–	4	6	–	4
Saginaw Valley State	6	–	4	6	–	4
Wayne State (MI)	6	–	4	6	–	5
Indianapolis	5	–	5	6	–	5
Hillsdale	5	–	5	5	–	6
Ashland	4	–	6	4	–	6
Mercyhurst	3	–	7	3	–	7
Northern Michigan	3	–	7	3	–	7
Findlay	1	–	9	2	–	9
Gannon	1	–	9	1	–	10
$ – Conference champion; ^ – NCAA Division II playoff participant; Rankings from AFCA poll

The 2006 Saginaw Valley State Cardinals football team represented Saginaw Valley State University (SVSU) as a member of the Great Lakes Intercollegiate Athletic Conference (GLIAC) during the 2006 NCAA Division II football season. In their eighth year under head coach Randy Awrey, the Cardinals compiled a 6–4 record (6–4 in conference games), finished in three-way tie for fourth place in the GLIAC, and outscored opponents by a total of 269 to 241.

=== Schedule ===
Date	Time	Opponent	Rank	Site	Result	Attendance	Source
September 2		at No. 21 Ashland	No. 5	Community Stadium; Ashland, OH	W 27–16	5,500	
September 9		Gannon	No. 5	Wickes Stadium; University Center, MI	W 26–10	3,500	
September 16	7:00 p.m.	at Ferris State	No. 5	Top Taggart Field; Big Rapids, MI	L 23–26	5,200	
September 23		Northern Michigan	No. 11	Wickes Stadium; University Center, MI	W 37–35	4,150	
September 30	12:00 p.m.	No. 14 Northwood	No. 12	Wickes Stadium; University Center, MI (Axe Bowl)	L 14–25	3,512	
October 7		at Findlay	No. 25	Donnell Stadium; Findlay, OH	W 31–14	1,412	
October 14		at Michigan Tech	No. 23	Sherman Field; Houghton, MI	L 7–20	2,011	
October 28		Indianapolis		Wickes Stadium; University Center, MI	W 23–16	1,006	
November 4	7:00 p.m.	at No. 1 Grand Valley State		Lubbers Stadium; Allendale, MI (Battle of the Valleys)	L 35–49	12,410	
November 11		Hillsdale		Wickes Stadium; University Center, MI	W 46–30	2,833	
Rankings from AFCA Poll released prior to the game; All times are in Eastern time

== 2007 ==
2007 Saginaw Valley State Cardinals football
- Conference: Great Lakes Intercollegiate Athletic Conference
- Record: 7–3 (7–3 GLIAC)
- Head coach: Randy Awrey (9th season)
- Home stadium: Harvey Randall Wickes Memorial Stadium

2007 Great Lakes Intercollegiate Athletic Conference football standings
	Conf.			Overall
Team	W		L	W		L
No. 4 Grand Valley State $^	9	–	0	12	–	1
No. 22 Ashland ^	8	–	1	8	–	2
Hillsdale	7	–	3	8	–	3
Saginaw Valley State *	7	–	3	7	–	3
Michigan Tech	6	–	4	6	–	5
Ferris State	5	–	5	6	–	5
Indianapolis	5	–	5	6	–	5
Northwood	5	–	5	5	–	5
Northern Michigan	4	–	6	4	–	6
Findlay	3	–	7	4	–	7
Mercyhurst	3	–	7	4	–	7
Wayne State (MI)	2	–	8	3	–	8
Gannon	0	–	10	0	–	11
$ – Conference champion; ^ – NCAA Division II playoff participant; * – Saginaw Valley State forfeited wins against Gannon, Ferris State, Northern Michigan, and Findlay.; Rankings from AFCA poll

The 2007 Saginaw Valley State Cardinals football team represented Saginaw Valley State University (SVSU) as a member of the Great Lakes Intercollegiate Athletic Conference (GLIAC) during the 2007 NCAA Division II football season. In their ninth year under head coach Randy Awrey, the Cardinals compiled a 7–3 record (7–3 in conference games), tied for third place in the GLIAC, and outscored opponents by a total of 292 to 206.

In late November 2007, SVSU announced that it would not renew Awrey's contract as haed coach. The school announced at the same time that it had submitted an infraction report to the NCAA concerning the payment of rent for Awrey's sons, who played for the SVSU football team. Awrey's attorney described the allegations as "silly" and "ridiculous", but stated that Awrey would not fight to keep his job as "he's not interested in working for people who don't appreciated him." Awrey compiled a 76-27 record in nine seasons as the school's head football coach.

=== Schedule ===
Date	Opponent	Site	Result	Attendance	Source
September 1	Ashland	Wickes Stadium; University Center, MI	L 27–32	3,650	
September 8	at Gannon	Gannon University Field; Erie, PA	W 49–7	2,150	
September 15	Ferris State	Wickes Stadium; University Center, MI	W 24–13	5,203	
September 22	at Northern Michigan	Superior Dome; Marquette, MI	W 42–37	3,194	
September 29	at Northwood	Hantz Stadium; Midland, MI (Axe Bowl)	L 10–28	4,199	
October 6	Findlay	Wickes Stadium; University Center, MI	W 44–7	4,316	
October 13	Michigan Tech	Wickes Stadium; University Center, MI	W 33–16	3,962	
October 27	at Indianapolis	Key Stadium; Indianapolis, IN	W 29–24	2,674	
November 3	No. 1 Grand Valley State	Wickes Stadium; University Center, MI (Battle of the Valleys)	L 10–21	7,108	
November 10	at No. 25 Hillsdale	Frank "Muddy" Waters Stadium; Hillsdale, MI	W 24–21	1,766	
Rankings from Coaches' Poll released prior to the game

== 2008 ==
2008 Saginaw Valley State Cardinals football
- Conference: Great Lakes Intercollegiate Athletic Conference
- Record: 7–3 (7–3 GLIAC)
- Head coach: Jim Collins (1st season)
- Home stadium: Harvey Randall Wickes Memorial Stadium

2008 Great Lakes Intercollegiate Athletic Conference football standings
	Conf.			Overall
Team	W		L	W		L
No. 4 Grand Valley State $^	10	–	0	11	–	1
No. 15 Ashland ^	8	–	2	9	–	4
Michigan Tech	7	–	3	8	–	3
Wayne State (MI)	7	–	3	8	–	3
Saginaw Valley State	7	–	3	7	–	3
Hillsdale	6	–	4	7	–	4
Ferris State	5	–	5	6	–	5
Indianapolis	4	–	6	5	–	6
Northern Michigan	2	–	8	2	–	8
Northwood	2	–	8	2	–	8
Findlay	1	–	9	2	–	9
Tiffin	1	–	9	1	–	10
+ – Conference co-champions; ^ – NCAA Division II playoff participant; Rankings from AFCA poll

The 2008 Saginaw Valley State Cardinals football team represented Saginaw Valley State University (SVSU) as a member of the Great Lakes Intercollegiate Athletic Conference (GLIAC) during the 2008 NCAA Division II football season. In their first year under head coach Jim Collins, the Cardinals compiled a 7–3 record (7–3 in conference games), finished in a three-way tie for third place in the GLIAC, and outscored opponents by a total of 262 to 224.

Collins was announced as SVSU's new heaed football coach in late December 2007. He had previously been the head football coach at Division III Capital University in Ohio. Collins had compiled a 66-51 record in 11 seasons at Capital.

=== Schedule ===
Date	Opponent	Rank	Site	Result	Attendance	Source
September 6	Wayne State (MI)		Wickes Stadium; University Center, MI	W 23–17	6,324	
September 13	No. 2 Grand Valley State	No. 25	Wickes Stadium; University Center, MI (Battle of the Valleys)	L 0–36	7,468	
September 20	at Northwood		Hantz Stadium; Midland, MI (Axe Bowl)	W 46–45	4,329	
September 27	Indianapolis		Wickes Stadium; University Center, MI	L 11–14	4,873	
October 4	at Northern Michigan		Superior Dome; Marquette, MI	W 38–21	3,102	
October 11	Tiffin		Wickes Stadium; University Center, MI	W 33–14	3,682	
October 18	at Ashland		Community Stadium; Ashland, OH	L 28–31	3,836	
October 25	Michigan Tech		Wickes Stadium; University Center, MI	W 40–23	4,037	
November 1	at Findlay		Donnell Stadium; Findlay, OH	W 17–9	1,054	
November 8	at Ferris State		Top Taggart Field; Big Rapids, MI	W 26–14	1,533	
Rankings from AFCA Poll released prior to the game

== 2009 ==
2009 Saginaw Valley State Cardinals football

NCAA Division II first round, L 20–35 at Nebraska–Kearney
- Conference: Great Lakes Intercollegiate Athletic Conference

Ranking
- AFCA: No. 19
- Record: 9–3 (8–2 GLIAC)
- Head coach: Jim Collins (2nd season)
- Home stadium: Harvey Randall Wickes Memorial Stadium

2009 Great Lakes Intercollegiate Athletic Conference football standings
	Conf.			Overall
Team	W		L	W		L
No. 2 Grand Valley State $^	9	–	1	13	–	2
No. 11 Hillsdale ^	8	–	2	10	–	3
No. 19 Saginaw Valley State ^	8	–	2	9	–	3
Northwood	7	–	3	7	–	3
Findlay	6	–	4	7	–	4
Northern Michigan	6	–	4	6	–	4
Ashland	6	–	4	6	–	5
Wayne State (MI)	5	–	5	6	–	5
Indianapolis	3	–	7	4	–	7
Michigan Tech	2	–	8	2	–	8
Ferris State	0	–	10	1	–	10
Tiffin	0	–	10	0	–	11
$ – Conference champion; ^ – NCAA Division II playoff participant; Rankings from AFCA poll

The 2009 Saginaw Valley State Cardinals football team represented Saginaw Valley State University (SVSU) as a member of the Great Lakes Intercollegiate Athletic Conference (GLIAC) during the 2009 NCAA Division II football season. In their second year under head coach Jim Collins, the Cardinals compiled a 9–3 record (8–2 in conference games), tied for second place in the GLIAC, and outscored opponents by a total of 342 to 252.

=== Schedule ===
Date	Time	Opponent	Rank	Site	Result	Attendance	Source
August 27		at No. 8 California (PA)		Adamson Stadium; California, PA	W 23–17	5,300	
September 5	12:00 p.m.	at Wayne State (MI)	No. 24	Tom Adams Field; Detroit, MI	W 21–13	2,862	
September 12	7:00 p.m.	at No. 1 Grand Valley State	No. 16	Lubbers Stadium; Allendale, MI (Battle of the Valleys)	L 7–38	16,467	
September 19	12:00 p.m.	Northwood	No. 23	Wickes Stadium; University Center, MI (Axe Bowl)	W 32–27	6,312	
September 26		at Indianapolis	No. 19	Key Stadium; Indianapolis, IN	W 34–13	4,432	
October 2		Northern Michigan	No. 16	Wickes Stadium; University Center, MI	L 20–23	5,482	
October 10		at Tiffin		Frost–Kalnow Stadium; Tiffin, OH	W 40–21	1,725	
October 17		Ashland		Wickes Stadium; University Center, MI	W 42–14	5,283	
October 24	1:00 p.m.	at Michigan Tech		Sherman Field; Houghton, MI	W 38–28	1,522	
October 31		Findlay	No. 24	Wickes Stadium; University Center, MI	W 24–16	3,780	
November 7	12:00 p.m.	Ferris State	No. 22	Wickes Stadium; University Center, MI	W 41–7	4,871	
November 14		at No. 6 Nebraska–Kearney*	No. 16	Ron & Carol Cope Stadium; Kearney, NE (NCAA Division II first round)	L 20–35	3,500	
*Non-conference game; Rankings from AFCA Poll released prior to the game; All times are in Eastern time
