= Ferris State Bulldogs football, 2000–2009 =

American college football season

2000–2009 Ferris State Bulldogs football
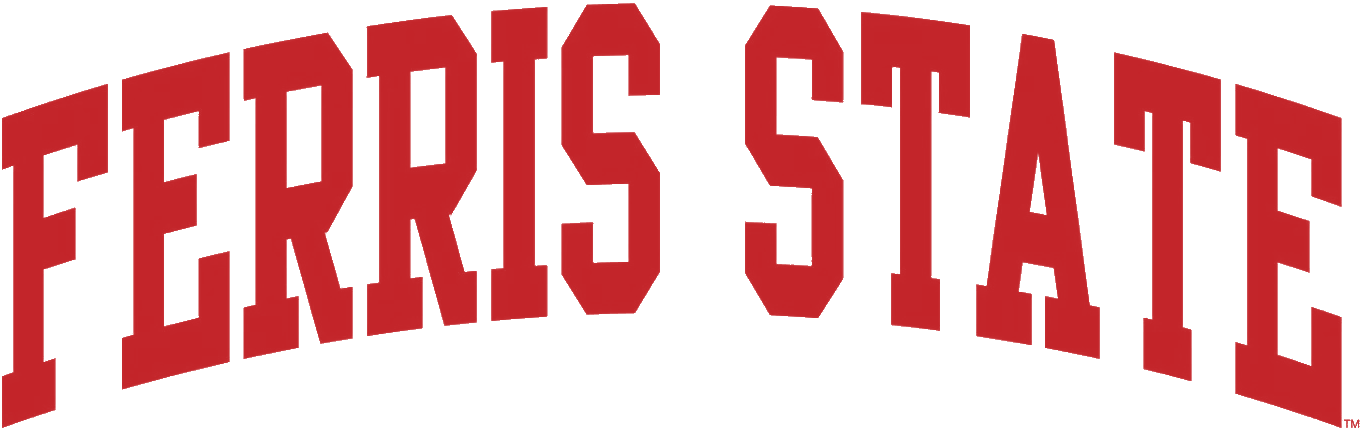
- Conference: Great Lakes Intercollegiate Athletic Conference
- Head coach: Jeff Pierce (1995–2011)
- Home stadium: Top Taggart Field

The Ferris State Bulldogs football program, 2000–2009 represented Ferris State University during the 2010s in NCAA Division II college football as a member of the Great Lakes Intercollegiate Athletic Conference (GLIAC). The team was led by head coach Jeff Pierce during the decade.

The team played its home games at Top Taggart Field in Big Rapids, Michigan.

== Decade overview ==
Year	Head coach	Overall record	Conf. record	Conf. rank	Points scored	Points against	Delta
2000	Jeff Pierce	5–6	5–5	5 (tie)	298	256	+42
2001	Jeff Pierce	7–4	7–3	3	274	248	+26
2002	Jeff Pierce	5–5	4–5	6	210	198	+12
2003	Jeff Pierce	6–5	5–5	4 (tie)	285	286	-1
2004	Jeff Pierce	6–5	6–4	5	273	183	+90
2005	Jeff Pierce	3–8	3–7	8 (tie)	258	355	-97
2006	Jeff Pierce	8–3	7–3	3	278	217	+61
2007	Jeff Pierce	6–5	5–5	6 (tie)	318	320	-2
2008	Jeff Pierce	6–5	5–5	7	182	228	-46
2009	Jeff Pierce	1–10	0–10	11 (tie)	122	402	-280
TOTAL		53–56	47–52				

== 2000 ==
2000 Ferris State Bulldogs football
- Conference: Great Lakes Intercollegiate Athletic Conference
- Record: 5–6 (5–5 GLIAC)
- Head coach: Jeff Pierce (6th season)
- Home stadium: Top Taggart Field

2000 Great Lakes Intercollegiate Athletic Conference football standings
	Conf.			Overall
Team	W		L	W		L
No. 2 Northwood +^	9	–	1	10	–	2
No. 4 Saginaw Valley State +^	9	–	1	9	–	3
Grand Valley State	7	–	3	7	–	4
Northern Michigan	6	–	4	6	–	5
Ashland	5	–	5	6	–	5
Michigan Tech	5	–	5	5	–	5
Ferris State	5	–	5	5	–	6
Wayne State (MI)	4	–	6	4	–	6
Mercyhurst	4	–	6	4	–	7
Hillsdale	2	–	8	3	–	8
Indianapolis	2	–	8	3	–	8
Findlay	2	–	8	2	–	8
+ – Conference co-champions; ^ – NCAA Division II playoff participant; Rankings from AFCA Northeast Region poll

The 2000 Ferris State Bulldogs football team represented Ferris State University (GVSU) as a member of the Great Lakes Intercollegiate Athletic Conference (GLIAC) during the 2000 NCAA Division II football season. In their sixth season under head coach Jeff Pierce, the Bulldogs compiled a 5–6 record (5–5 in conference games), finished in a three-way tie for fifth place in the GLIAC, and outscored opponents by a total of 298 to 256.

=== Schedule ===
Date	Time	Opponent	Site	Result	Attendance	Source
September 2		at No. 5 Indiana (PA)*	Miller Stadium; Indiana, PA	L 13–24		
September 9		at Findlay	Donnell Stadium; Findlay, OH	W 33–15		
September 16	7:00 p.m.	Saginaw Valley State	Top Taggart Field; Big Rapids, MI	L 36–39	4,329	
September 23		Wayne State (MI)	Top Taggart Field; Big Rapids, MI	W 51–30	1,688	
September 30		at No. 3 (Northeast) Northwood	Hantz Stadium; Midland, MI	W 28–14	4,820	
October 7		at Grand Valley State	Lubbers Stadium; Allendale, MI (Anchor–Bone Classic)	L 20–21	5,073	
October 14		Mercyhurst	Top Taggart Field; Big Rapids, MI	L 10–21		
October 21		at Michigan Tech	Sherman Field; Houghton, MI	L 27–34	1,135	
October 28		No. 7 (Northeast) Northern Michigan	Top Taggart Field; Big Rapids, MI	W 28–7		
November 4		Hillsdale	Top Taggart Field; Big Rapids, MI	L 14–23		
November 11		No. 5 (Northeast) Indianapolis	Top Taggart Field; Big Rapids, MI	W 38–28		
*Non-conference game; Rankings from AFCA Poll released prior to the game; All times are in Eastern time

== 2001 ==
2001 Ferris State Bulldogs football
- Conference: Great Lakes Intercollegiate Athletic Conference
- Record: 7–4 (7–3 GLIAC)
- Head coach: Jeff Pierce (7th season)
- Home stadium: Top Taggart Field

2001 Great Lakes Intercollegiate Athletic Conference football standings
	Conf.			Overall
Team	W		L	W		L
No. 2 Grand Valley State $^	9	–	0	13	–	1
No. 6 Saginaw Valley State ^	9	–	1	11	–	2
Ferris State	7	–	3	7	–	4
Indianapolis	6	–	4	7	–	4
Ashland	5	–	5	6	–	5
Michigan Tech	5	–	5	5	–	5
Northern Michigan	3	–	7	4	–	7
Northwood	3	–	6	3	–	6
Wayne State (MI)	3	–	6	3	–	7
Findlay	3	–	7	3	–	8
Hillsdale	3	–	7	3	–	8
Mercyhurst	2	–	7	2	–	7
$ – Conference champion; ^ – NCAA Division II playoff participant; Rankings from AFCA poll

The 2001 Ferris State Bulldogs football team represented Ferris State University (GVSU) as a member of the Great Lakes Intercollegiate Athletic Conference (GLIAC) during the 2001 NCAA Division II football season. In their seventh season under head coach Jeff Pierce, the Bulldogs compiled a 7–4 record (7–3 in conference games), finished in third place in the GLIAC, and outscored opponents by a total of 274 to 248.

=== Schedule ===
Date	Time	Opponent	Site	Result	Attendance	Source
September 1	8:00 p.m.	at South Dakota State*	Coughlin–Alumni Stadium; Brookings, SD	L 24–34	5,145	
September 8		Findlay	Top Taggart Field; Big Rapids, MI	W 33–10		
September 15	12:00 p.m.	at Saginaw Valley State	Wickes Stadium; University Center, MI	L 20–33	6,813	
September 22		at Wayne State (MI)	Tom Adams Field; Detroit, MI	W 38–14	2,115	
September 29	7:00 p.m.	Northwood	Top Taggart Field; Big Rapids, MI	W 32–29	2,683	
October 6	1:30 p.m.	No. 15 Grand Valley State	Top Taggart Field; Big Rapids, MI (Anchor–Bone Classic)	L 17–63	2,901	
October 13		at Mercyhurst	Tullio Stadium; Erie, PA	L 14–25		
October 20		Michigan Tech	Top Taggart Field; Big Rapids, MI	W 35–0		
October 27		at Northern Michigan	Superior Dome; Marquette, MI	W 7–6		
November 3		at Hillsdale	Frank "Muddy" Waters Stadium; Hillsdale, MI	W 38–21		
November 10		Indianapolis	Top Taggart Field; Big Rapids, MI	W 16–13		
*Non-conference game; Rankings from AFCA Poll released prior to the game; All times are in Eastern time

== 2002 ==
2002 Ferris State Bulldogs football
- Conference: Great Lakes Intercollegiate Athletic Conference
- Record: 5–5 (4–5 GLIAC)
- Head coach: Jeff Pierce (8th season)
- Home stadium: Top Taggart Field

2002 Great Lakes Intercollegiate Athletic Conference football standings
	Conf.			Overall
Team	W		L	W		L
No. 1 Grand Valley State $^	9	–	0	14	–	0
No. 25 Findlay	8	–	2	9	–	2
No. 13 Saginaw Valley State ^	8	–	2	9	–	3
Northwood	7	–	3	7	–	4
Northern Michigan	6	–	4	6	–	5
Ferris State	4	–	5	5	–	5
Indianapolis	4	–	6	5	–	6
Hillsdale	4	–	6	4	–	7
Michigan Tech	3	–	7	3	–	7
Wayne State (MI)	3	–	7	3	–	8
Ashland	2	–	8	2	–	9
Mercyhurst	1	–	9	2	–	9
$ – Conference champion; ^ – NCAA Division II playoff participant; Rankings from AFCA poll

The 2002 Ferris State Bulldogs football team represented Ferris State University as a member of the Great Lakes Intercollegiate Athletic Conference (GLIAC) during the 2002 NCAA Division II football season. In their eighth season under head coach Jeff Pierce, the Bulldogs compiled a 5–5 record (4–5 in conference games), finished in sixth place in the GLIAC, and outscored opponents by a total of 210 to 198.

A September 14 game with Grand Valley State was cancelled following the death of Ferris State freshman Matt Sklom who collapsed during practice on the Wednesday before the game.

=== Schedule ===
Date	Time	Opponent	Site	Result	Attendance	Source
September 7		Hillsdale	Top Taggart Field; Big Rapids, MI	W 33–21		
September 14		No. 1 Grand Valley State	Top Taggart Field; Big Rapids, MI	Canceled		
September 21		at Northern Michigan	Superior Dome; Marquette, MI	L 3–17		
September 28	7:00 p.m.	Wayne State (MI)	Top Taggart Field; Big Rapids, MI	L 21–36	2,682	
October 5	12:00 p.m.	at Northwood	Hantz Stadium; Midland, MI	L 24–41	3,311	
October 12		Michigan Tech	Top Taggart Field; Big Rapids, MI	W 21–14		
October 19		at Mercyhurst	Tullio Stadium; Erie, PA	W 19–13		
October 26	1:30 p.m.	No. 9 Saginaw Valley State	Top Taggart Field; Big Rapids, MI	W 24–3	2,263	
November 2		at No. 23 Findlay	Donnell Stadium; Findlay, OH	L 21–28		
November 9		Ashland	Top Taggart Field; Big Rapids, MI	W 30–8		
November 16		Indianapolis	Top Taggart Field; Big Rapids, MI	L 14–17		
Rankings from AFCA Poll released prior to the game; All times are in Eastern time

== 2003 ==
2003 Ferris State Bulldogs football
- Conference: Great Lakes Intercollegiate Athletic Conference
- Record: 6–5 (5–5 GLIAC)
- Head coach: Jeff Pierce (9th season)
- Home stadium: Top Taggart Field

2003 Great Lakes Intercollegiate Athletic Conference football standings
	Conf.			Overall
Team	W		L	W		L
No. 4 Saginaw Valley State $^	10	–	0	12	–	1
No. 1 Grand Valley State ^	9	–	1	14	–	1
Northwood	6	–	4	6	–	5
Ferris State	5	–	5	6	–	5
Findlay	5	–	5	6	–	5
Indianapolis	5	–	5	6	–	5
Michigan Tech	5	–	5	5	–	5
Mercyhurst	4	–	6	5	–	6
Hillsdale	4	–	6	4	–	7
Northern Michigan	3	–	7	3	–	8
Wayne State (MI)	2	–	8	3	–	8
Ashland	2	–	8	2	–	9
$ – Conference champion; ^ – NCAA Division II playoff participant; Rankings from AFCA poll

The 2003 Ferris State Bulldogs football team represented Ferris State University (GVSU) as a member of the Great Lakes Intercollegiate Athletic Conference (GLIAC) during the 2003 NCAA Division II football season. In their ninth season under head coach Jeff Pierce, the Bulldogs compiled a 6–5 record (5–5 in conference games), finished in a four-way tie for fourth place in the GLIAC, and were outscored by a total of 286 to 285.

=== Schedule ===
Date	Time	Opponent	Site	Result	Attendance	Source
September 6		at Hillsdale	Frank "Muddy" Waters Stadium; Hillsdale, MI	W 25–20		
September 13	7:00 p.m.	at No. 1 Grand Valley State	Lubbers Stadium; Allendale, MI (Anchor–Bone Classic)	L 10–40	12,627	
September 20		Northern Michigan	Top Taggart Field; Big Rapids, MI	L 14–26		
September 27	12:00 p.m.	at Wayne State (MI)	Tom Adams Field; Detroit, MI	W 29–16	2,215	
October 4	7:00 p.m.	Northwood	Top Taggart Field; Big Rapids, MI	W 40–16	1,884	
October 11		at Michigan Tech	Sherman Field; Houghton, MI	L 30–49		
October 18		Mercyhurst	Top Taggart Field; Big Rapids, MI	W 33–7		
October 25	12:00 p.m.	at No. 2 Saginaw Valley State	Wickes Stadium; University Center, MI	L 31–38	5,175	
November 1		Findlay	Top Taggart Field; Big Rapids, MI	W 36–29		
November 8		at Ashland	Community Stadium; Ashland, OH	W 17–10		
November 15		Indianapolis	Top Taggart Field; Big Rapids, MI	L 20–35		
Rankings from AFCA Poll released prior to the game; All times are in Eastern time

== 2004 ==
2004 Ferris State Bulldogs football
- Conference: Great Lakes Intercollegiate Athletic Conference
- Record: 6–5 (6–4 GLIAC)
- Head coach: Jeff Pierce (10th season)
- Home stadium: Top Taggart Field

2004 Great Lakes Intercollegiate Athletic Conference football standings
	Conf.			Overall
Team	W		L	W		L
No. 10 Northwood +^	9	–	1	10	–	2
No. 11 Michigan Tech +^	9	–	1	9	–	2
No. 9 Grand Valley State ^	8	–	2	10	–	3
No. 25 Saginaw Valley State	7	–	3	7	–	3
Ferris State	6	–	4	6	–	5
Findlay	5	–	5	6	–	5
Ashland	4	–	6	5	–	6
Hillsdale	4	–	6	4	–	7
Mercyhurst	4	–	6	4	–	7
Gannon	3	–	7	4	–	7
Indianapolis	3	–	7	4	–	7
Northern Michigan	2	–	8	2	–	8
Wayne State (MI)	1	–	9	1	–	9
+ – Conference co-champions; ^ – NCAA Division II playoff participant; Rankings from AFCA poll

The 2004 Ferris State Bulldogs football team represented Ferris State University (GVSU) as a member of the Great Lakes Intercollegiate Athletic Conference (GLIAC) during the 2004 NCAA Division II football season. In their tenth season under head coach Jeff Pierce, the Bulldogs compiled a 6–5 record (6–4 in conference games), finished in fifth place in the GLIAC, and were outscored by a total of 273 to 183.

=== Schedule ===
Date	Time	Opponent	Site	Result	Attendance	Source
August 28	7:00 p.m.	No. 1 Grand Valley State	Top Taggart Field; Big Rapids, MI (Anchor–Bone Classic)	L 6–24	8,426	
September 4		at Ashland	Ashland, OH	W 23–17		
September 11		Hillsdale	Top Taggart Field; Big Rapids, MI	W 21–7		
September 18		Indianapolis	Top Taggart Field; Big Rapids, MI	W 24–14		
September 25		at Mercyhurst	Tullio Stadium; Erie, PA	W 31–28		
October 2		Findlay	Top Taggart Field; Big Rapids, MI	W 35–7		
October 9		at No. 9 North Dakota*	Alerus Center; Grand Forks, ND	L 0–45		
October 16		at Northern Michigan	Superior Dome; Marquette, MI	W 17–14		
October 23		No. 8 Michigan Tech	Top Taggart Field; Big Rapids, MI	L 6–28		
October 30	12:00 p.m.	at No. 13 Northwood	Hantz Stadium; Midland, MI	L 6–42	3,187	
November 6	1:00 p.m.	No. 25 Saginaw Valley State	Top Taggart Field; Big Rapids, MI	L 14–47	1,899	
*Non-conference game; Rankings from AFCA Poll released prior to the game; All times are in Eastern time

== 2005 ==
2005 Ferris State Bulldogs football
- Conference: Great Lakes Intercollegiate Athletic Conference
- Record: 3–8 (3–7 GLIAC)
- Head coach: Jeff Pierce (11th season)
- Home stadium: Top Taggart Field

2005 Great Lakes Intercollegiate Athletic Conference football standings
	Conf.			Overall
Team	W		L	W		L
No. 1 Grand Valley State $^	9	–	0	13	–	0
No. 3 Saginaw Valley State * ^	9	–	1	11	–	2
No. 18 Northwood ^	8	–	2	9	–	3
Ashland	8	–	2	9	–	2
Michigan Tech	6	–	3	6	–	3
Indianapolis	5	–	5	6	–	5
Hillsdale	4	–	6	5	–	6
Wayne State (MI)	3	–	7	3	–	7
Ferris State	3	–	7	3	–	8
Gannon	3	–	7	3	–	8
Findlay	2	–	8	3	–	8
Mercyhurst	2	–	8	2	–	8
Northern Michigan	2	–	8	2	–	8
$ – Conference champion; ^ – NCAA Division II playoff participant; * – Saginaw Valley State forfeited all wins, giving all other GLIAC teams except Grand Valley State, Ashland, and Gannon one more official win than shown.; Rankings from AFCA poll

The 2005 Ferris State Bulldogs football team represented Ferris State University (GVSU) as a member of the Great Lakes Intercollegiate Athletic Conference (GLIAC) during the 2005 NCAA Division II football season. In their 12th season under head coach Jeff Pierce, the Bulldogs compiled a 3–8 record (3–7 in conference games), finished in three-way tie for eighth place in the GLIAC, and were outscored by a total of 355 to 258.

=== Schedule ===
Date	Time	Opponent	Site	Result	Attendance	Source
August 27	7:00 p.m.	at No. 3 Grand Valley State	Lubbers Stadium; Allendale, MI (Anchor–Bone Classic)	L 10–30	14,557	
September 3		Ashland	Top Taggart Field; Big Rapids, MI	L 21–24		
September 10		at Hillsdale	Frank "Muddy" Waters Stadium; Hillsdale, MI	L 13–34		
September 17		Indianapolis	Top Taggart Field; Big Rapids, MI	L 3–7		
September 24		Mercyhurst	Top Taggart Field; Big Rapids, MI	W 33–27		
October 1		at Findlay	Donnell Stadium; Findlay, OH	W 34–31		
October 8		at No. 2 North Dakota*	Alerus Center; Grand Forks, ND	L 7–44		
October 15		Northern Michigan	Top Taggart Field; Big Rapids, MI	W 62–42		
October 22		at No. 25 Michigan Tech	Sherman Field; Houghton, MI	L 19–35		
October 29	1:00 p.m.	No. 15 Northwood	Top Taggart Field; Big Rapids, MI	L 23–42	2,049	
November 5		at No. 6 Saginaw Valley State	Wickes Stadium; University Center, MI	L 32–39		
*Non-conference game; Rankings from AFCA Poll released prior to the game; All times are in Eastern time

== 2006 ==
2006 Ferris State Bulldogs football
- Conference: Great Lakes Intercollegiate Athletic Conference
- Record: 8–3 (7–3 GLIAC)
- Head coach: Jeff Pierce (12th season)
- Home stadium: Top Taggart Field

2006 Great Lakes Intercollegiate Athletic Conference football standings
	Conf.			Overall
Team	W		L	W		L
No. 1 Grand Valley State $^	10	–	0	15	–	0
No. 18 Northwood ^	8	–	2	8	–	3
Ferris State	7	–	3	8	–	3
Michigan Tech	6	–	4	6	–	4
Saginaw Valley State	6	–	4	6	–	4
Wayne State (MI)	6	–	4	6	–	5
Indianapolis	5	–	5	6	–	5
Hillsdale	5	–	5	5	–	6
Ashland	4	–	6	4	–	6
Mercyhurst	3	–	7	3	–	7
Northern Michigan	3	–	7	3	–	7
Findlay	1	–	9	2	–	9
Gannon	1	–	9	1	–	10
$ – Conference champion; ^ – NCAA Division II playoff participant; Rankings from AFCA poll

The 2006 Ferris State Bulldogs football team represented Ferris State University (GVSU) as a member of the Great Lakes Intercollegiate Athletic Conference (GLIAC) during the 2006 NCAA Division II football season. In their 12th season under head coach Jeff Pierce, the Bulldogs compiled a 8–3 record (7–3 in conference games), finished in third place in the GLIAC, and outscored opponents by a total of 278 to 217.

=== Schedule ===
Date	Time	Opponent	Site	Result	Attendance	Source
September 2		at Kentucky State*	Frankfort, KY	W 31–13		
September 9		at Mercyhurst	Tullio Stadium; Erie, PA	W 28–7		
September 16	7:00 p.m.	No. 5 Saginaw Valley State	Top Taggart Field; Big Rapids, MI	W 26–23	5,200	
September 23		at Hillsdale	Frank "Muddy" Waters Stadium; Hillsdale, MI	L 27–29		
September 30		at Northern Michigan	Superior Dome; Marquette, MI	W 42–24		
October 7		Michigan Tech	Top Taggart Field; Big Rapids, MI	L 7–41		
October 14		Gannon	Top Taggart Field; Big Rapids, MI	W 35–14		
October 21		at Ashland	Ashland, OH	W 38–7		
October 28	2:00 p.m.	No. 1 Grand Valley State	Top Taggart Field; Big Rapids, MI (Anchor–Bone Classic)	L 6–28	4,936	
November 4	12:00 p.m.	at No. 14 Northwood	Hantz Stadium; Midland, MI	W 17–14	2,096	
November 11	2:00 p.m.	Wayne State (MI)	Top Taggart Field; Big Rapids, MI	W 21–17	3,363	
*Non-conference game; Rankings from AFCA Poll released prior to the game; All times are in Eastern time

== 2007 ==
2007 Ferris State Bulldogs football
- Conference: Great Lakes Intercollegiate Athletic Conference
- Record: 6–5 (5–5 GLIAC)
- Head coach: Jeff Pierce (13th season)
- Home stadium: Top Taggart Field

2007 Great Lakes Intercollegiate Athletic Conference football standings
	Conf.			Overall
Team	W		L	W		L
No. 4 Grand Valley State $^	9	–	0	12	–	1
No. 22 Ashland ^	8	–	1	8	–	2
Hillsdale	7	–	3	8	–	3
Saginaw Valley State *	7	–	3	7	–	3
Michigan Tech	6	–	4	6	–	5
Ferris State	5	–	5	6	–	5
Indianapolis	5	–	5	6	–	5
Northwood	5	–	5	5	–	5
Northern Michigan	4	–	6	4	–	6
Findlay	3	–	7	4	–	7
Mercyhurst	3	–	7	4	–	7
Wayne State (MI)	2	–	8	3	–	8
Gannon	0	–	10	0	–	11
$ – Conference champion; ^ – NCAA Division II playoff participant; * – Saginaw Valley State forfeited wins against Gannon, Ferris State, Northern Michigan, and Findlay.; Rankings from AFCA poll

The 2007 Ferris State Bulldogs football team represented Ferris State University (GVSU) as a member of the Great Lakes Intercollegiate Athletic Conference (GLIAC) during the 2007 NCAA Division II football season. In their 13th season under head coach Jeff Pierce, the Bulldogs compiled a 6–5 record (5–5 in conference games), finished in a three-way tie for sixth place in the GLIAC, and outscored opponents by a total of 320 to 318.

=== Schedule ===
Date	Time	Opponent	Site	Result	Attendance	Source
September 1		Kentucky State*	Top Taggart Field; Big Rapids, MI	W 42–19		
September 8	7:00 p.m.	Mercyhurst	Top Taggart Field; Big Rapids, MI	L 23–42		
September 15	12:00 p.m.	at Saginaw Valley State	Wickes Stadium; University Center, MI	L 13–24	5,203	
September 22		Hillsdale	Top Taggart Field; Big Rapids, MI	W 44–41		
September 29		Northern Michigan	Top Taggart Field; Big Rapids, MI	W 31–13		
October 6		at Michigan Tech	Sherman Field; Houghton, MI	L 12–40		
October 13		at Gannon	Erie, PA	W 48–14		
October 20		Ashland	Top Taggart Field; Big Rapids, MI	L 35–37		
October 27	7:00 p.m.	at No. 1 Grand Valley State	Lubbers Stadium; Allendale, MI (Anchor–Bone Classic)	L 7–34	10,858	
November 3	2:00 p.m.	Northwood	Top Taggart Field; Big Rapids, MI	W 48–41 ^{OT}	1,802	
November 10	12:00 p.m.	at Wayne State (MI)	Tom Adams Field; Detroit, MI	W 17–13	2,354	
*Non-conference game; Rankings from AFCA Poll released prior to the game; All times are in Eastern time

== 2008 ==
2008 Ferris State Bulldogs football
- Conference: Great Lakes Intercollegiate Athletic Conference
- Record: 6–5 (5–5 GLIAC)
- Head coach: Jeff Pierce (14th season)
- Home stadium: Top Taggart Field

2008 Great Lakes Intercollegiate Athletic Conference football standings
	Conf.			Overall
Team	W		L	W		L
No. 4 Grand Valley State $^	10	–	0	11	–	1
No. 15 Ashland ^	8	–	2	9	–	4
Michigan Tech	7	–	3	8	–	3
Wayne State (MI)	7	–	3	8	–	3
Saginaw Valley State	7	–	3	7	–	3
Hillsdale	6	–	4	7	–	4
Ferris State	5	–	5	6	–	5
Indianapolis	4	–	6	5	–	6
Northern Michigan	2	–	8	2	–	8
Northwood	2	–	8	2	–	8
Findlay	1	–	9	2	–	9
Tiffin	1	–	9	1	–	10
+ – Conference co-champions; ^ – NCAA Division II playoff participant; Rankings from AFCA poll

The 2008 Ferris State Bulldogs football team represented Ferris State University as a member of the Great Lakes Intercollegiate Athletic Conference (GLIAC) during the 2008 NCAA Division II football season. In their 13th season under head coach Jeff Pierce, the Bulldogs compiled a 6–5 record (5–5 in conference games), finished in seventh place in the GLIAC, and were outscored by a total of 228 to 182.

=== Schedule ===
Date	Time	Opponent	Rank	Site	Result	Attendance	Source
August 30	2:30 p.m.	at Tiffin*		Frost Kalnow Stadium; Tiffin, OH	W 14–12	1,500	
September 6	1:00 p.m.	at No. 24 Ashland		Community Stadium; Ashland, OH	W 25–24	3,007	
September 13	7:00 p.m.	Findlay		Top Taggart Field; Big Rapids, MI	W 14–0	2,773	
September 20	7:00 p.m.	at No. 2 Grand Valley State	No. 24	Lubbers Stadium; Allendale, MI (Anchor–Bone Classic)	L 13–31	14,612	
September 27	2:00 p.m.	Northern Michigan		Top Taggart Field; Big Rapids, MI	W 31–24	2,331	
October 4	1:00 p.m.	at Michigan Tech^{†}	No. 25	Sherman Field; Houghton, MI	L 7–21	2,989	
October 11	6:00 p.m.	at Indianapolis		Key Stadium; Indianapolis, IN	W 31–24	3,019	
October 18	2:00 p.m.	Wayne State (MI)		Top Taggart Field; Big Rapids, MI	L 0–19	3,869	
October 25	12:00 p.m.	Northwood		Top Taggart Field; Big Rapids, MI	W 19–13	1,633	
November 1	2:30 p.m.	at Hillsdale		Frank "Muddy" Waters Stadium; Hillsdale, MI	L 14–34	1,676	
November 8	12:00 p.m.	Saginaw Valley State		Top Taggart Field; Big Rapids, MI	L 14–26	1,533	
*Non-conference game; ^{†}Homecoming; Rankings from AFCA Poll released prior to the game; All times are in Eastern time

== 2009 ==
2009 Ferris State Bulldogs football
- Conference: Great Lakes Intercollegiate Athletic Conference
- Record: 1–10 (0–10 GLIAC)
- Head coach: Jeff Pierce (15th season)
- Home stadium: Top Taggart Field

2009 Great Lakes Intercollegiate Athletic Conference football standings
	Conf.			Overall
Team	W		L	W		L
No. 2 Grand Valley State $^	9	–	1	13	–	2
No. 11 Hillsdale ^	8	–	2	10	–	3
No. 19 Saginaw Valley State ^	8	–	2	9	–	3
Northwood	7	–	3	7	–	3
Findlay	6	–	4	7	–	4
Northern Michigan	6	–	4	6	–	4
Ashland	6	–	4	6	–	5
Wayne State (MI)	5	–	5	6	–	5
Indianapolis	3	–	7	4	–	7
Michigan Tech	2	–	8	2	–	8
Ferris State	0	–	10	1	–	10
Tiffin	0	–	10	0	–	11
$ – Conference champion; ^ – NCAA Division II playoff participant; Rankings from AFCA poll

The 2009 Ferris State Bulldogs football team represented Ferris State University (GVSU) as a member of the Great Lakes Intercollegiate Athletic Conference (GLIAC) during the 2009 NCAA Division II football season. In their 13th season under head coach Jeff Pierce, the Bulldogs compiled a 1–10 record (0–10 in conference games), tied for last place in the GLIAC, and were outscored by a total of 402 to 122.

=== Schedule ===
Date	Time	Opponent	Site	Result	Attendance	Source
August 29	7:00 p.m.	Tiffin*	Top Taggart Field; Big Rapids, MI	W 34–14	3,407	
September 5	7:00 p.m.	No. 23 Ashland	Top Taggart Field; Big Rapids, MI	L 23–44	2,066	
September 12	12:00 p.m.	at Findlay	Donnell Stadium; Findlay, OH	L 7–43	1,921	
September 19	7:00 p.m.	No. 1 Grand Valley State	Top Taggart Field; Big Rapids, MI (Anchor–Bone Classic)	L 10–17	4,309	
September 26	4:00 p.m.	at Northern Michigan	Superior Dome; Marquette, MI	L 0–34	4,271	
October 3	7:00 p.m.	vs. Michigan Tech	Fifth Third Ballpark; Comstock Park, MI	L 6–38	2,964	
October 10	2:00 p.m.	Indianapolis^{†}	Top Taggart Field; Big Rapids, MI	L 7–34	2,676	
October 17	12:00 p.m.	at Wayne State (MI)	Tom Adams Field; Detroit, MI	L 7–45	2,455	
October 24	12:00 p.m.	at Northwood	Hantz Stadium; Midland, MI	L 7–33	1,922	
October 31	2:00 p.m.	No. 22 Hillsdale	Top Taggart Field; Big Rapids, MI	L 14–59	1,429	
November 7	12:00 p.m.	at No. 22 Saginaw Valley State	Wickes Stadium; University Center, MI	L 7–41	4,871	
*Non-conference game; ^{†}Homecoming; Rankings from AFCA Poll released prior to the game; All times are in Eastern time
