= Wayne State Warriors football, 2000–2009 =

American college football season

2000–2009 Wayne State Warriors football
- Conference: Great Lakes Intercollegiate Athletic Conference
- Head coach: Steve Kazor (2000–2003); Paul Winters (2004–2022)
- Home stadium: Tom Adams Field

The Wayne State Warriors football program, 2000–2009 represented Wayne State University during the 2000s in NCAA Division II college football as a member of the Great Lakes Intercollegiate Athletic Conference (GLIAC). The team was led by two head coaches during the decade: Steve Kazor (2000–2003); and Paul Winters (2004–2022).

The team played its home games at Tom Adams Field in Detroit. The field was named after Thomas B. Adams, a Wayne State football and track athlete who became a decorated naval avaitor in World War II.

== 2000 ==
2000 Wayne State Warriors football
- Conference: Great Lakes Intercollegiate Athletic Conference
- Record: 4–6 (4–6 GLIAC)
- Head coach: Steve Kazor (1st season)
- Home stadium: Tom Adams Field

2000 Great Lakes Intercollegiate Athletic Conference football standings
	Conf.			Overall
Team	W		L	W		L
No. 2 Northwood +^	9	–	1	10	–	2
No. 4 Saginaw Valley State +^	9	–	1	9	–	3
Grand Valley State	7	–	3	7	–	4
Northern Michigan	6	–	4	6	–	5
Ashland	5	–	5	6	–	5
Michigan Tech	5	–	5	5	–	5
Ferris State	5	–	5	5	–	6
Wayne State (MI)	4	–	6	4	–	6
Mercyhurst	4	–	6	4	–	7
Hillsdale	2	–	8	3	–	8
Indianapolis	2	–	8	3	–	8
Findlay	2	–	8	2	–	8
+ – Conference co-champions; ^ – NCAA Division II playoff participant; Rankings from AFCA Northeast Region poll

The 2000 Wayne State Warriors football team represented Wayne State University as a member of the Great Lakes Intercollegiate Athletic Conference (GLIAC) during the 2000 NCAA Division II football season. In their first season under head coach Steve Kazor, the Warriors compiled a 4–6 record (4–6 in conference games), tied for eighth place in the GLIAC, and were outscored by a total 313 to 286.

Kazor was hired as head coach in February 2000. He had previously been the head coach at McPherson in Kansas in 1998 and 1999. He was Wayne State's third coach in five years.

Wayne State led the GLIAC with 455.1 yards of total offense per game in 2000. Wide receiver Pierre Brown tallied 1,492 receiving yards, leading all Division II players in receiving yards per game and setting a school record. Running back Thabiti Williamson ranked second in Division II with 212.8 all-purpose yards per game.

=== Schedule ===
Date	Opponent	Site	Result	Attendance	Source
September 2	at Mercyhurst	Tullio Stadium; Erie, PA	L 27–37	2,350	
September 9	Ashland	Tom Adams Field; Detroit, MI	L 41–42	989	
September 23	at Ferris State	Top Taggart Field; Big Rapids, MI	L 30–51	1,688	
September 30	Findlay	Tom Adams Field; Detroit, MI	W 41–20	1,107	
October 7	No. 3 (Northeast) Northern Michigan	Tom Adams Field; Detroit, MI	W 35–14	1,874	
October 14	at Hillsdale	Frank "Muddy" Waters Stadium; Hillsdale, MI	W 21–13	1,637	
October 21	No. 8 (Northeast) Saginaw Valley State	Tom Adams Field; Detroit, MI	L 19–31	1,649	
October 28	at Indianapolis	Key Stadium; Indianapolis, IN	W 24–21	3,033	
November 4	Grand Valley State	Tom Adams Field; Detroit, MI	L 20–22	1,680	
November 11	No. 2 (Northeast) Northwood	Hantz Stadium; Midland, MI	L 28–62	3,102	
Rankings from AFCA Poll released prior to the game

== 2001 ==
2001 Wayne State Warriors football
- Conference: Great Lakes Intercollegiate Athletic Conference
- Record: 3–7 (3–6 GLIAC)
- Head coach: Steve Kazor (2nd season)
- Home stadium: Tom Adams Field

2001 Great Lakes Intercollegiate Athletic Conference football standings
	Conf.			Overall
Team	W		L	W		L
No. 2 Grand Valley State $^	9	–	0	13	–	1
No. 6 Saginaw Valley State ^	9	–	1	11	–	2
Ferris State	7	–	3	7	–	4
Indianapolis	6	–	4	7	–	4
Ashland	5	–	5	6	–	5
Michigan Tech	5	–	5	5	–	5
Northern Michigan	3	–	7	4	–	7
Northwood	3	–	6	3	–	6
Wayne State (MI)	3	–	6	3	–	7
Findlay	3	–	7	3	–	8
Hillsdale	3	–	7	3	–	8
Mercyhurst	2	–	7	2	–	7
$ – Conference champion; ^ – NCAA Division II playoff participant; Rankings from AFCA poll

The 2001 Wayne State Warriors football team represented Wayne State University as a member of the Great Lakes Intercollegiate Athletic Conference (GLIAC) during the 2001 NCAA Division II football season. In their second season under head coach Steve Kazor, the Warriors compiled a 3–7 record (3–6 in conference games), tied for eighth place in the GLIAC, and were outscored by a total to .

=== Schedule ===
Date	Time	Opponent	Site	Result	Attendance	Source
August 30	8:05 p.m.	at No. 23 I-AA Northern Iowa*	UNI-Dome; Cedar Falls, IA	L 14–34	9,210	
September 8		at Ashland	Ashland, OH	W 19–16	4,000	
September 15		Mercyhurst		Canceled		
September 22		Ferris State	Tom Adams Field; Detroit, MI	L 14–38	2,115	
September 29		at Findlay	Donnell Stadium; Findlay, OH	L 43–44	2,475	
October 6		at Northern Michigan	Superior Dome; Marquette, MI	W 44–41	2,512	
October 13		Hillsdale	Tom Adams Field; Detroit, MI	W 19–17	2,203	
October 20		at No. 21 Saginaw Valley State	Wickes Stadium; University Center, MI	L 12–45	3,841	
October 27		Indianapolis	Tom Adams Field; Detroit, MI	L 14–38	1,156	
November 3		at No. 4 Grand Valley State	Lubbers Stadium; Allendale, MI	L 12–77	3,766	
November 10	12:00 p.m.	Northwood	Tom Adams Field; Detroit, MI	L 26–39	1,385	
*Non-conference game; Rankings from AFCA Poll released prior to the game; All times are in Eastern time

== 2002 ==
2002 Wayne State Warriors football
- Conference: Great Lakes Intercollegiate Athletic Conference
- Record: 3–8 (3–7 GLIAC)
- Head coach: Steve Kazor (3rd season)
- Home stadium: Tom Adams Field

2002 Great Lakes Intercollegiate Athletic Conference football standings
	Conf.			Overall
Team	W		L	W		L
No. 1 Grand Valley State $^	9	–	0	14	–	0
No. 25 Findlay	8	–	2	9	–	2
No. 13 Saginaw Valley State ^	8	–	2	9	–	3
Northwood	7	–	3	7	–	4
Northern Michigan	6	–	4	6	–	5
Ferris State	4	–	5	5	–	5
Indianapolis	4	–	6	5	–	6
Hillsdale	4	–	6	4	–	7
Michigan Tech	3	–	7	3	–	7
Wayne State (MI)	3	–	7	3	–	8
Ashland	2	–	8	2	–	9
Mercyhurst	1	–	9	2	–	9
$ – Conference champion; ^ – NCAA Division II playoff participant; Rankings from AFCA poll

The 2002 Wayne State Warriors football team represented Wayne State University as a member of the Great Lakes Intercollegiate Athletic Conference (GLIAC) during the 2002 NCAA Division II football season. In their third season under head coach Steve Kazor, the Warriors compiled a 3–8 record (3–7 in conference games), tied for ninth place in the GLIAC, and were outscored by a total of 394 to 279.

Tailback Craig Duppong from Lockport, Illinois, led the team with 1,875 all-purposes yards, including 1,315 rushing yards, and 12 touchdowns.

=== Schedule ===
Date	Time	Opponent	Site	Result	Attendance	Source
August 29	8:05 p.m.	at No. 3 I-AA Northern Iowa*	UNI-Dome; Cedar Falls, IA	L 0–34	10,221	
September 14	6:00 p.m.	at Findlay	Donnell Stadium; Findlay, OH	L 21–33	2,189	
September 21	12:00 p.m.	No. 1 Grand Valley State	Tom Adams Field; Detroit, MI	L 14–49	2,445	
September 28	7:00 p.m.	at Ferris State	Top Taggart Field; Big Rapids, MI	W 36–21	2,682	
October 5	12:00 p.m.	Ashland	Tom Adams Field; Detroit, MI	L 20–25	2,827	
October 12	2:30 p.m.	at Hillsdale	Frank "Muddy" Waters Stadium; Hillsdale, MI	L 34–40	4,123	
October 19	12:00 p.m.	at Michigan Tech	Sherman Field; Houghton, MI	W 34–31	1,112	
October 26	1:00 p.m.	Northern Michigan	Tom Adams Field; Detroit, MI	L 46–49 ^{OT}	4,269	
November 2	12:00 p.m.	at Northwood	Hantz Stadium; Midland, MI	L 27–41	1,116	
November 9	12:00 p.m.	Mercyhurst	Tom Adams Field; Detroit, MI	W 33–29	1,583	
November 16	12:00 p.m.	No. 10 Saginaw Valley State	Tom Adams Field; Detroit, MI	L 14–42	2,424	
*Non-conference game; Rankings from AFCA Poll released prior to the game; All times are in Eastern time

== 2003 ==
2003 Wayne State Warriors football
- Conference: Great Lakes Intercollegiate Athletic Conference
- Record: 3–8 (2–8 GLIAC)
- Head coach: Steve Kazor (4th season)
- Home stadium: Tom Adams Field

2003 Great Lakes Intercollegiate Athletic Conference football standings
	Conf.			Overall
Team	W		L	W		L
No. 4 Saginaw Valley State $^	10	–	0	12	–	1
No. 1 Grand Valley State ^	9	–	1	14	–	1
Northwood	6	–	4	6	–	5
Ferris State	5	–	5	6	–	5
Findlay	5	–	5	6	–	5
Indianapolis	5	–	5	6	–	5
Michigan Tech	5	–	5	5	–	5
Mercyhurst	4	–	6	5	–	6
Hillsdale	4	–	6	4	–	7
Northern Michigan	3	–	7	3	–	8
Wayne State (MI)	2	–	8	3	–	8
Ashland	2	–	8	2	–	9
$ – Conference champion; ^ – NCAA Division II playoff participant; Rankings from AFCA poll

The 2003 Wayne State Warriors football team represented Wayne State University as a member of the Great Lakes Intercollegiate Athletic Conference (GLIAC) during the 2003 NCAA Division II football season. In their fourth and season under head coach Steve Kazor, the Warriors compiled a 3–8 record (2–8 in conference games), tied for last place in the GLIAC, and were outscored by a total .

=== Schedule ===
Date	Time	Opponent	Site	Result	Attendance	Source
August 30	12:00 p.m.	Gannon	Tom Adams Field; Detroit, MI	W 38–21	2,103	
September 13	12:00 p.m.	No. 23 Findlay	Tom Adams Field; Detroit, MI	L 3–19	2,325	
September 20	7:00 p.m.	at No. 1 Grand Valley State	Lubbers Stadium; Allendale, MI	L 14–50	9,844	
September 27	12:00 p.m.	Ferris State	Tom Adams Field; Detroit, MI	L 16–29	2,215	
October 4	1:25 p.m.	at Ashland	Community Stadium; Ashland, OH	W 29–19	3,800	
October 11	12:00 p.m.	Hillsdale	Tom Adams Field; Detroit, MI	L 26–49	4,341	
October 18	12:00 p.m.	Michigan Tech	Tom Adams Field; Detroit, MI	L 35–42	1,828	
October 25	7:00 p.m.	at Northern Michigan	Superior Dome; Marquette, MI	W 45–42	2,209	
November 1	12:00 p.m.	Northwood	Tom Adams Field; Detroit, MI	L 24–28	1,995	
November 8	1:30 p.m.	at Mercyhurst	Tullio Field; Erie, PA	L 10–17	1,267	
November 15	12:00 p.m.	at No. 1 Saginaw Valley State	Wickes Stadium; University Center, MI	L 21–38	3,873	
Rankings from AFCA Poll released prior to the game; All times are in Eastern time

== 2004 ==
2004 Wayne State Warriors football
- Conference: Great Lakes Intercollegiate Athletic Conference
- Record: 1–9 (1–9 GLIAC)
- Head coach: Paul Winters (1st season)
- Home stadium: Tom Adams Field

2004 Great Lakes Intercollegiate Athletic Conference football standings
	Conf.			Overall
Team	W		L	W		L
No. 10 Northwood +^	9	–	1	10	–	2
No. 11 Michigan Tech +^	9	–	1	9	–	2
No. 9 Grand Valley State ^	8	–	2	10	–	3
No. 25 Saginaw Valley State	7	–	3	7	–	3
Ferris State	6	–	4	6	–	5
Findlay	5	–	5	6	–	5
Ashland	4	–	6	5	–	6
Hillsdale	4	–	6	4	–	7
Mercyhurst	4	–	6	4	–	7
Gannon	3	–	7	4	–	7
Indianapolis	3	–	7	4	–	7
Northern Michigan	2	–	8	2	–	8
Wayne State (MI)	1	–	9	1	–	9
+ – Conference co-champions; ^ – NCAA Division II playoff participant; Rankings from AFCA poll

The 2004 Wayne State Warriors football team represented Wayne State University as a member of the Great Lakes Intercollegiate Athletic Conference (GLIAC) during the 2004 NCAA Division II football season. In their first season under head coach Paul Winters, the Warriors compiled a 1–9 record (1–9 in conference games), finished in last place in the GLIAC, and were outscored by a total of 403 to 115.

Winters was hired as Wayne State's new head coach in December 2003. Wayne State had not had a winning season on the field since 1993. He had been an assistant coach at Akron for the prior nine years.

=== Schedule ===
Date	Time	Opponent	Site	Result	Attendance	Source
September 4	12:00 p.m.	at No. 25 Northwood	Hantz Stadium; Midland, MI	L 3–70	2,347	
September 11	12:00 p.m.	No. 17 Saginaw Valley State	Tom Adams Field; Detroit, MI	L 0–45	2,067	
September 18	12:00 p.m.	Northern Michigan	Tom Adams Field; Detroit, MI	L 13–18	1,992	
September 25	1:00 p.m.	at Indianapolis	Key Stadium; Indianapolis, IN	W 24–21 ^{OT}	2,000	
October 2	12:00 p.m.	No. 1 Grand Valley State	Tom Adams Field; Detroit, MI	L 0–34	2,794	
October 9	1:00 p.m.	at No. 17 Michigan Tech	Sherman Field; Houghton, MI	L 23–61	2,775	
October 16	6:00 p.m.	at Findlay	Donnell Stadium; Findlay, OH	L 6–47	750	
October 23	12:00 p.m.	Ashland	Tom Adams Field; Detroit, MI	L 21–28	3,118	
October 30	1:00 p.m.	at Gannon	Gannon University Field; Erie, PA	L 15–42	1,846	
November 6	12:00 p.m.	vs. Hillsdale	Ford Field; Detroit, MI	L 10–37	24,423	
Rankings from AFCA Poll released prior to the game; All times are in Eastern time

== 2005 ==
2005 Wayne State Warriors football
- Conference: Great Lakes Intercollegiate Athletic Conference
- Record: 3–7 (3–7 GLIAC)
- Head coach: Paul Winters (2nd season)
- Home stadium: Tom Adams Field

2005 Great Lakes Intercollegiate Athletic Conference football standings
	Conf.			Overall
Team	W		L	W		L
No. 1 Grand Valley State $^	9	–	0	13	–	0
No. 3 Saginaw Valley State * ^	9	–	1	11	–	2
No. 18 Northwood ^	8	–	2	9	–	3
Ashland	8	–	2	9	–	2
Michigan Tech	6	–	3	6	–	3
Indianapolis	5	–	5	6	–	5
Hillsdale	4	–	6	5	–	6
Wayne State (MI)	3	–	7	3	–	7
Ferris State	3	–	7	3	–	8
Gannon	3	–	7	3	–	8
Findlay	2	–	8	3	–	8
Mercyhurst	2	–	8	2	–	8
Northern Michigan	2	–	8	2	–	8
$ – Conference champion; ^ – NCAA Division II playoff participant; * – Saginaw Valley State forfeited all wins, giving all other GLIAC teams except Grand Valley State, Ashland, and Gannon one more official win than shown.; Rankings from AFCA poll

The 2005 Wayne State Warriors football team represented Wayne State University as a member of the Great Lakes Intercollegiate Athletic Conference (GLIAC) during the 2005 NCAA Division II football season. In their second season under head coach Paul Winters, the Warriors compiled a 3–7 record (3–7 in conference games), finished in a three-way tie for eighth place in the GLIAC, and were outscored by a total of 290 to 241.

=== Schedule ===
Date	Time	Opponent	Site	Result	Attendance	Source
September 3	12:00 p.m.	No. 21 Northwood	Tom Adams Field; Detroit, MI	L 14–28	2,127	
September 10	12:00 p.m.	at No. 12 Saginaw Valley State	Wickes Stadium; University Center, MI	L 3–29	3,750	
September 17	5:00 p.m.	at Northern Michigan	Superior Dome; Marquette, MI	L 13–15	2,851	
September 24	12:00 p.m.	Indianapolis	Tom Adams Field; Detroit, MI	L 16–23	1,738	
October 1	7:00 p.m.	at No. 1 Grand Valley State	Lubbers Stadium; Allendale, MI	L 22–36	10,942	
October 8	12:00 p.m.	No. 9 Michigan Tech	Tom Adams Field; Detroit, MI	W 25–14	2,805	
October 15	12:00 p.m.	Findlay	Tom Adams Field; Detroit, MI	W 34–17	2,852	
October 22	1:00 p.m.	at Ashland	Jack Miller Stadium; Ashland, OH	L 3–27	1,000	
October 29	12:00 p.m.	Gannon	Tom Adams Field; Detroit, MI	W 14–7	1,834	
November 5	2:30 p.m.	at Hillsdale	Frank "Muddy" Waters Stadium; Hillsdale, MI	L 14–28	1,108	
Rankings from AFCA Poll released prior to the game; All times are in Eastern time

== 2006 ==
2006 Wayne State Warriors football
- Conference: Great Lakes Intercollegiate Athletic Conference
- Record: 6–5 (6–4 GLIAC)
- Head coach: Paul Winters (3rd season)
- Home stadium: Tom Adams Field

2006 Great Lakes Intercollegiate Athletic Conference football standings
	Conf.			Overall
Team	W		L	W		L
No. 1 Grand Valley State $^	10	–	0	15	–	0
No. 18 Northwood ^	8	–	2	8	–	3
Ferris State	7	–	3	8	–	3
Michigan Tech	6	–	4	6	–	4
Saginaw Valley State	6	–	4	6	–	4
Wayne State (MI)	6	–	4	6	–	5
Indianapolis	5	–	5	6	–	5
Hillsdale	5	–	5	5	–	6
Ashland	4	–	6	4	–	6
Mercyhurst	3	–	7	3	–	7
Northern Michigan	3	–	7	3	–	7
Findlay	1	–	9	2	–	9
Gannon	1	–	9	1	–	10
$ – Conference champion; ^ – NCAA Division II playoff participant; Rankings from AFCA poll

The 2006 Wayne State Warriors football team represented Wayne State University as a member of the Great Lakes Intercollegiate Athletic Conference (GLIAC) during the 2006 NCAA Division II football season. In their third season under head coach Paul Winters, the Warriors compiled a 6–5 record (6–4 in conference games), finished in a three-way tie for fourth place in the GLIAC, and outscored opponents by a total of 287 to 255.

Key additions in 2006 included freshman defensive end Athan Anagonye.

=== Schedule ===
Date	Time	Opponent	Site	Result	Attendance	Source
September 2	1:00 p.m.	at Michigan Tech	Sherman Field; Houghton, MI	W 36–14	2,977	
September 9	12:00 p.m.	Saint Joseph's (IN)	Tom Adams Field; Detroit, MI	L 10–17	1,971	
September 16	12:00 p.m.	Mercyhurst	Tom Adams Field; Detroit, MI	W 35–31	1,582	
September 23	7:00 p.m.	at Findlay	Donnell Stadium; Findlay, OH	W 24–3	1,156	
September 30	12:00 p.m.	No. 1 Grand Valley State	Tom Adams Field; Detroit, MI	L 13–36	2,585	
October 7	1:00 p.m.	at Gannon	Gannon University Field; Erie, PA	W 30–3	1,724	
October 14	12:00 p.m.	Hillsdale	Tom Adams Field; Detroit, MI	W 41–26	4,274	
October 21	12:00 p.m.	Indianapolis	Tom Adams Field; Detroit, MI	L 14–39	1,584	
October 28	12:00 p.m.	at No. 17 Northwood	Hantz Stadium; Midland, MI	L 34–48	1,405	
November 4	12:00 p.m.	Ashland	Tom Adams Field; Detroit, MI	W 33–17	1,798	
November 11	2:00 p.m.	at Ferris State	Top Taggart Field; Big Rapids, MI	L 17–21	3,363	
Rankings from AFCA Poll released prior to the game; All times are in Eastern time

== 2007 ==
2007 Wayne State Warriors football
- Conference: Great Lakes Intercollegiate Athletic Conference
- Record: 3–8 (2–8 GLIAC)
- Head coach: Paul Winters (4th season)
- Home stadium: Tom Adams Field

2007 Great Lakes Intercollegiate Athletic Conference football standings
	Conf.			Overall
Team	W		L	W		L
No. 4 Grand Valley State $^	9	–	0	12	–	1
No. 22 Ashland ^	8	–	1	8	–	2
Hillsdale	7	–	3	8	–	3
Saginaw Valley State *	7	–	3	7	–	3
Michigan Tech	6	–	4	6	–	5
Ferris State	5	–	5	6	–	5
Indianapolis	5	–	5	6	–	5
Northwood	5	–	5	5	–	5
Northern Michigan	4	–	6	4	–	6
Findlay	3	–	7	4	–	7
Mercyhurst	3	–	7	4	–	7
Wayne State (MI)	2	–	8	3	–	8
Gannon	0	–	10	0	–	11
$ – Conference champion; ^ – NCAA Division II playoff participant; * – Saginaw Valley State forfeited wins against Gannon, Ferris State, Northern Michigan, and Findlay.; Rankings from AFCA poll

The 2007 Wayne State Warriors football team represented Wayne State University as a member of the Great Lakes Intercollegiate Athletic Conference (GLIAC) during the 2007 NCAA Division II football season. In their fourth season under head coach Paul Winters, the Warriors compiled a 3–8 record (2–8 in conference games), finished in 12th place in the GLIAC, and were outscored by a total of 383 to 335.

Joique Bell led the team with 1,427 rushing yards, 28 touchdowns, and 168 points scored. Other statistical leaders included Trent Pohl (1,072 passing yards), Ed Sanders (27 receptions for 418 yards), and Alan Guy (95 total tackles, 58 solo tackles, 14 tackles for loss).

=== Schedule ===
Date	Time	Opponent	Site	Result	Attendance	Source
September 1	12:00 p.m.	Michigan Tech	Tom Adams Field; Detroit, MI	L 14–21	2,656	
September 8	12:00 p.m.	at Saint Joseph's (IN)	Alumni Stadium; Rensselaer, IN	W 42–19	1,688	
September 15	1:30 p.m.	at Mercyhurst	Tullio Field; Erie, PA	L 50–58 ^{OT}	1,372	
September 22	12:00 p.m.	Findlay	Tom Adams Field; Detroit, MI	L 28–35 ^{OT}	2,385	
September 29	7:00 p.m.	vs. No. 1 Grand Valley State	Fifth Third Ballpark; Comstock Park, MI	L 10–41	10,124	
October 6	12:00 p.m.	Gannon	Tom Adams Field; Detroit, MI	W 56–21	4,823	
October 13	2:30 p.m.	at Hillsdale	Frank "Muddy" Waters Stadium; Hillsdale, MI	L 21–35	1,503	
October 20	6:00 p.m.	at Indianapolis	Key Stadium; Indianapolis, IN	W 34–28	4,058	
October 27	12:00 p.m.	Northwood	Tom Adams Field; Detroit, MI	L 25–45	1,786	
November 3	1:00 p.m.	at No. 23 Ashland	Community Stadium; Ashland, OH	L 42–63	3,215	
November 10	12:00 p.m.	Ferris State	Tom Adams Field; Detroit, MI	L 13–17	2,354	
Rankings from AFCA Poll released prior to the game; All times are in Eastern time

== 2008 ==
2008 Wayne State Warriors football
- Conference: Great Lakes Intercollegiate Athletic Conference
- Record: 8–3 (7–3 GLIAC)
- Head coach: Paul Winters (5th season)
- Home stadium: Tom Adams Field

2008 Great Lakes Intercollegiate Athletic Conference football standings
	Conf.			Overall
Team	W		L	W		L
No. 4 Grand Valley State $^	10	–	0	11	–	1
No. 15 Ashland ^	8	–	2	9	–	4
Michigan Tech	7	–	3	8	–	3
Wayne State (MI)	7	–	3	8	–	3
Saginaw Valley State	7	–	3	7	–	3
Hillsdale	6	–	4	7	–	4
Ferris State	5	–	5	6	–	5
Indianapolis	4	–	6	5	–	6
Northern Michigan	2	–	8	2	–	8
Northwood	2	–	8	2	–	8
Findlay	1	–	9	2	–	9
Tiffin	1	–	9	1	–	10
+ – Conference co-champions; ^ – NCAA Division II playoff participant; Rankings from AFCA poll

The 2008 Wayne State Warriors football team represented Wayne State University as a member of the Great Lakes Intercollegiate Athletic Conference (GLIAC) during the 2008 NCAA Division II football season. In their fifth season under head coach Paul Winters, the Warriors compiled an 8–3 record (7–3 in conference games), finished in a three-way tie for third place in the GLIAC, and outsored opponents by a total of 222 to 161.

Running back Joique Bell led the team with 1,152 rushing yards. Bell also led the team leading in receptions (20) and scoring (78 points). Quarterback Kevin Smith completed 74 of 159 passes for 806 yards, nine touchdowns, and six interceptions.

=== Schedule ===
Date	Time	Opponent	Rank	Site	Result	Attendance
August 30	12:30 p.m.	Mercyhurst*		Tom Adams Field; Detroit, MI	W 14–10	2,705
September 6	12:00 p.m.	at Saginaw Valley State		Wickes Stadium; University Center, MI	L 17–23	6,324
September 13	12:00 p.m.	Indianapolis		Tom Adams Field; Detroit, MI	W 6–0	932
September 20	4:00 p.m.	at Findlay		Donnell Stadium; Findlay, OH	W 28–7	1,532
September 27	12:00 p.m.	Tiffin		Tom Adams Field; Detroit, MI	W 34–18	2,215
October 4	1:00 p.m.	at Ashland		Community Stadium; Ashland, OH	L 14–41	4,188
October 11	12:00 p.m.	Northern Michigan		Tom Adams Field; Detroit, MI	W 24–10	4,502
October 18	2:00 p.m.	at Ferris State		Top Taggart Field; Big Rapids, MI	W 19–0	3,869
October 25	12:00 p.m.	Hillsdale		Tom Adams Field; Detroit, MI	W 14–7	1,984
November 1	12:00 p.m.	at Northwood		Hantz Stadium; Midland, MI	W 42–21	1,254
November 8	12:00 p.m.	No. 1 Grand Valley State	No. 25	Tom Adams Field; Detroit, MI	L 10–24	5,152
*Non-conference game; Rankings from AFCA Poll released prior to the game; All times are in Eastern time

== 2009 ==
2009 Wayne State Warriors football
- Conference: Great Lakes Intercollegiate Athletic Conference
- Record: 6–5 (5–5 GLIAC)
- Head coach: Paul Winters (6th season)
- Home stadium: Tom Adams Field

2009 Great Lakes Intercollegiate Athletic Conference football standings
	Conf.			Overall
Team	W		L	W		L
No. 2 Grand Valley State $^	9	–	1	13	–	2
No. 11 Hillsdale ^	8	–	2	10	–	3
No. 19 Saginaw Valley State ^	8	–	2	9	–	3
Northwood	7	–	3	7	–	3
Findlay	6	–	4	7	–	4
Northern Michigan	6	–	4	6	–	4
Ashland	6	–	4	6	–	5
Wayne State (MI)	5	–	5	6	–	5
Indianapolis	3	–	7	4	–	7
Michigan Tech	2	–	8	2	–	8
Ferris State	0	–	10	1	–	10
Tiffin	0	–	10	0	–	11
$ – Conference champion; ^ – NCAA Division II playoff participant; Rankings from AFCA poll

The 2009 Wayne State Warriors football team represented Wayne State University as a member of the Great Lakes Intercollegiate Athletic Conference (GLIAC) during the 2009 NCAA Division II football season. In their sixth season under head coach Paul Winters, the Warriors compiled a 6–5 record (5–5 in conference games), finished in eighth place in the GLIAC, and outscored opponents by a total of 322 to 320.

Running back Joique Bell led the team with 2,084 rushing yards in 2009, an average of 6.4 yards per carry. He concluded his Wayne State career as the program's all-time leading rusher.

Quarterback Mickey Mohner completed 73 of 138 passes for 1,123 yards, nine touchdowns, eight interceptions, and a 131.18 passer rating.

=== Schedule ===
Date	Time	Opponent	Rank	Site	Result	Attendance	Source
August 29	12:00 p.m.	Mercyhurst*		Tom Adams Field; Detroit, MI	W 31–13	1,928	
September 5	12:00 p.m.	No. 24 Saginaw Valley State		Tom Adams Field; Detroit, MI	L 13–21	2,862	
September 12	6:00 p.m.	at Indianapolis		Key Stadium; Indianapolis, IN	W 27–23	3,162	
September 19	12:00 p.m.	Findlay		Tom Adams Field; Detroit, MI	W 35–21	2,507	
September 26	1:30 p.m.	at Tiffin		Frost Kalnow Stadium; Tiffin, OH	W 38–8	550	
October 3	12:00 p.m.	Ashland	No. 22	Tom Adams Field; Detroit, MI	W 47–40	3,682	
October 10	1:00 p.m.	at Northern Michigan	No. 19	Superior Dome; Marquette, MI	L 20–45	2,879	
October 17	12:00 p.m.	Ferris State		Tom Adams Field; Detroit, MI	W 45–7	2,455	
October 24	2:30 p.m.	at No. 25 Hillsdale		Frank "Muddy" Waters Stadium; Hillsdale, MI	L 14–45	1,496	
October 31	12:00 p.m.	Northwood		Tom Adams Field; Detroit, MI	L 24–38	2,309	
November 7	1:00 p.m.	at No. 5 Grand Valley State		Lubbers Stadium; Allendale, MI	L 28–59	8,397	
*Non-conference game; Rankings from AFCA Poll released prior to the game; All times are in Eastern time
