= 2006 Grand Valley State Lakers football team =

American college football season

2006 Grand Valley State Lakers football

NCAA Division II champion GLIAC champion

NCAA Division II Championship Game, W 17–14 vs. Northwest Missouri State
- Conference: Great Lakes Intercollegiate Athletic Conference
- Record: 15–0 (10–0 GLIAC)
- Head coach: Chuck Martin (3rd season)
- Home stadium: Lubbers Stadium

2006 Great Lakes Intercollegiate Athletic Conference football standings
	Conf.			Overall
Team	W		L	W		L
No. 1 Grand Valley State $^	10	–	0	15	–	0
No. 18 Northwood ^	8	–	2	8	–	3
Ferris State	7	–	3	8	–	3
Michigan Tech	6	–	4	6	–	4
Saginaw Valley State	6	–	4	6	–	4
Wayne State (MI)	6	–	4	6	–	5
Indianapolis	5	–	5	6	–	5
Hillsdale	5	–	5	5	–	6
Ashland	4	–	6	4	–	6
Mercyhurst	3	–	7	3	–	7
Northern Michigan	3	–	7	3	–	7
Findlay	1	–	9	2	–	9
Gannon	1	–	9	1	–	10
$ – Conference champion; ^ – NCAA Division II playoff participant; Rankings from AFCA poll

The 2006 Grand Valley State Lakers football team was an American football team that won the 2006 NCAA Division II national championship.

The team represented Grand Valley State University in the Great Lakes Intercollegiate Athletic Conference (GLIAC) during the 2006 NCAA Division II football season. In their third season under head coach Chuck Martin, the Lakers compiled a perfect 15–0 record (10–0 against conference opponents), outscored opponents by a total of 533 to 233, and won the GLIAC championship.

The team advanced to the playoffs and won the national championship by defeating Northwest Missouri State in the championship game. The championship was the second in a row for Grand Valley and the fourth in five years.

The team played its home games at Lubbers Stadium in Allendale Charter Township, Michigan.

== Schedule ==
Date	Time	Opponent	Rank	Site	Result	Attendance	Source
September 2	7:00 p.m.	at Findlay	No. 1	Donnell Stadium; Findlay, OH	W 13–0	1,250	
September 9	7:00 p.m.	Ashland	No. 1	Lubbers Stadium; Allendale, MI	W 30–24	12,817	
September 16	12:00 p.m.	at St. Joseph's (IN)*	No. 1	Alumni Stadium; Rensselaer, IN	W 31–6	1,729	
September 21	7:00 p.m.	Michigan Tech	No. 1	Lubbers Stadium; Allendale, MI	W 41–20	10,209	
September 30	12:00 p.m.	at Wayne State (MI)	No. 1	Tom Adams Field; Detroit, MI	W 36–13	2,585	
October 7	7:00 p.m.	Mercyhurst	No. 1	Lubbers Stadium; Allendale, MI	W 49–17	10,121	
October 14	6:00 p.m.	Indianapolis	No. 1	Lubbers Stadium; Allendale, MI	W 33–7	2,711	
October 21	7:00 p.m.	No. 9 Northwood^{†}	No. 1	Lubbers Stadium; Allendale, MI	W 45–7	13,480	
October 28	2:00 p.m.	at Ferris State	No. 1	Top Taggert Stadium; Big Rapids, MI (Anchor–Bone Classic)	W 28–6	4,936	
November 4	7:00 p.m.	Saginaw Valley State	No. 1	Lubbers Stadium; Allendale, MI (Battle of the Valleys)	W 49–35	12,410	
November 11	1:00 p.m.	at Northern Michigan	No. 1	Superior Dome; Marquette, MI	W 47–17	1,950	
November 25	1:00 p.m.	No. 13 South Dakota*	No. 1	Lubbers Stadium; Allendale, MI (NCAA Division II first round)	W 35–17	4,133	
December 2	12:30 p.m.	No. 7 North Dakota*	No. 1	Lubbers Stadium; Allendale, MI (NCAA Division II quarterfinal)	W 30–20	5,184	
December 10	7:00 p.m.	No. 3 Delta State*	No. 1	Lubbers Stadium; Allendale, M (NCAA Division II semifinal)	W 49–30	4,297	
December 16	12:00 p.m.	vs. No. 2 Northwest Missouri State*	No. 1	Braly Municipal Stadium; Florence, AL (NCAA Division II Championship Game)	W 17–14	7,437	
*Non-conference game; ^{†}Homecoming; Rankings from American Football Coaches Association Poll released prior to the game; All times are in Eastern time
