= 2005 Grand Valley State Lakers football team =

American college football season

2005 Grand Valley State Lakers football

NCAA Division II champion GLIAC champion

NCAA Division II Championship Game, W 10–3 vs. Northwest Missouri State
- Conference: Great Lakes Intercollegiate Athletic Conference
- Record: 13–0 (9–0 GLIAC)
- Head coach: Chuck Martin (2nd season)
- Home stadium: Lubbers Stadium

2005 Great Lakes Intercollegiate Athletic Conference football standings
	Conf.			Overall
Team	W		L	W		L
No. 1 Grand Valley State $^	9	–	0	13	–	0
No. 3 Saginaw Valley State * ^	9	–	1	11	–	2
No. 18 Northwood ^	8	–	2	9	–	3
Ashland	8	–	2	9	–	2
Michigan Tech	6	–	3	6	–	3
Indianapolis	5	–	5	6	–	5
Hillsdale	4	–	6	5	–	6
Wayne State (MI)	3	–	7	3	–	7
Ferris State	3	–	7	3	–	8
Gannon	3	–	7	3	–	8
Findlay	2	–	8	3	–	8
Mercyhurst	2	–	8	2	–	8
Northern Michigan	2	–	8	2	–	8
$ – Conference champion; ^ – NCAA Division II playoff participant; * – Saginaw Valley State forfeited all wins, giving all other GLIAC teams except Grand Valley State, Ashland, and Gannon one more official win than shown.; Rankings from AFCA poll

The 2005 Grand Valley State Lakers football team was an American football team that won the 2005 NCAA Division II national championship.

The team represented the Grand Valley State University in the Great Lakes Intercollegiate Athletic Conference (GLIAC) during the 2005 NCAA Division II football season. In their second season under head coach Chuck Martin, the Lakers compiled a perfect 13–0 record (9–0 against conference opponents), outscored opponents by a total of 434 to 170, and won the GLIAC championship. The team advanced to the playoffs and won the national championship by defeating Northwest Missouri State in the championship game.

The team played its home games at Lubbers Stadium in Allendale Charter Township, Michigan.

== Schedule ==
Date	Time	Opponent	Rank	Site	Result	Attendance	Source
August 27	7:00 p.m.	Ferris State	No. 3	Lubbers Stadium; Allendale, MI	W 30–10	14,557	
September 3	7:00 p.m.	Gannon	No. 2	Lubbers Stadium; Allendale, MI	W 61–10	7,191	
September 10	6:00 p.m.	Indianapolis	No. 2	Lubbers Stadium; Allendale, MI	W 29–13	3,118	
September 17	7:00 p.m.	at Ashland	No. 2	Jack Miller Stadium; Ashland, OH	W 14–10	4,700	
October 1	7:00 p.m.	Wayne State (MI)	No. 1	Lubbers Stadium; Allendale, MI	W 36–22	10,942	
October 8	7:00 p.m.	at Hillsdale	No. 1	Frank "Muddy" Waters Stadium; Hillsdale, MI	W 38–10		
October 15	7:00 p.m.	No. 4 Saginaw Valley State	No. 1	Lubbers Stadium; Allendale, MI (Battle of the Valleys)	W 31–10	14,472	
October 21	12:00 p.m.	at No. 9 Northwood	No. 1	Hantz Stadium; Midland, MI	W 30–14	3,553	
October 29	7:00 p.m.	Northern Michigan^{†}	No. 1	Lubbers Stadium; Allendale, MI	W 48–14	10,460	
November 5		Michigan Tech	No. 1	Lubbers Stadium; Allendale, MI	Canceled		
November 19	1:00 p.m.	No. 8 North Dakota*	No. 1	Lubbers Stadium; Allendale, MI (NCAA Division II Second Round)	W 17–3	5,429	
November 26	12:05 p.m.	No. 3 Saginaw Valley State	No. 1	Lubbers Stadium; Allendale, MI (NCAA Division II Quarterfinal)	W 24–17	5,364	
December 3	1:00 p.m.	No. 5 East Stroudsburg*	No. 1	Lubbers Stadium; Allendale, MI (NCAA Division II Seminfinal)	W 55–20	5,521	
December 10	4:05 p.m.	vs. No. 2 Northwest Missouri State*	No. 1	Braly Municipal Stadium; Florence, AL (NCAA Division II Championship Game)	W 21–17	6,837	
*Non-conference game; ^{†}Homecoming; Rankings from American Football Coaches Association Poll released prior to the game; All times are in Eastern time
