= Tim Driscoll =

American football coach

Biographical details
- Education: North Dakota State

Coaching career (HC unless noted)
- 1990–1992: North Dakota State (SA)
- 1993–1996: North Dakota State (GA)
- 1997–1998: Box Elder HS (UT) (DC)
- 1999: North Dakota Science (assistant)
- 2000: Fort Lewis (DC)
- 2001: Northern Michigan (DC)
- 2002: Jamestown (DC)
- 2003: Minnesota–Crookston (DC)
- 2004–2013: Michigan Tech (DC)
- 2015–2017: Finlandia
- 2018–2019: UNC Pembroke (DC)

Head coaching record
- Overall: 4–18

Tim Driscoll is an American football coach. He was the defensive coordinator at the University of North Carolina at Pembroke. Driscoll served as the head football coach at Finlandia University in Hancock, Michigan from 2015 to 2017.

== Head coaching record ==
Year	Team	Overall	Conference	Standing	Bowl/playoffs
Finlandia Lions (NCAA Division III independent) (2015–2017)
2015	Finlandia	3–7			
2016	Finlandia	1–7			
2017	Finlandia	2–4			
Finlandia:		4–18			
Total:		4–18			
