= University Center, Michigan =

- Unincorporated community
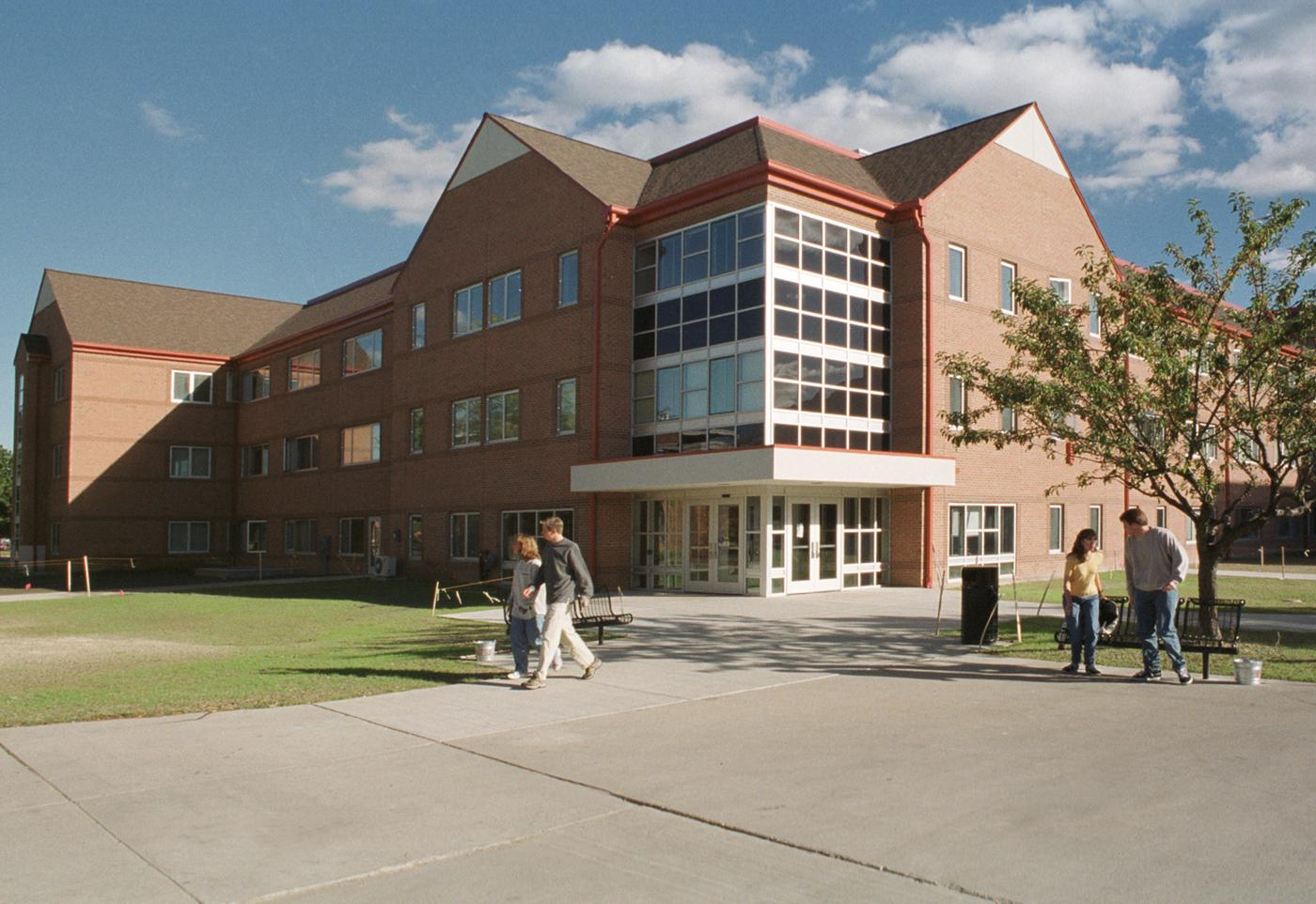
- Saginaw Valley State University

- Location within the state of Michigan Location within the United States
- Coordinates: 43°33′30″N 83°58′57″W
- Country: United States
- State: Michigan
- County: Bay and Saginaw County
- Townships: Frankenlust and Kochville
- Established: 1961
- Time zone: UTC-5 (Eastern (EST))
  - Summer (DST): UTC-4 (EDT)
- ZIP code(s): 48710
- Area code: 989

University Center is an unincorporated community in the U.S. state of Michigan.

The community encompasses two separate areas using the 48710 ZIP Code, including Delta College in Bay County and Saginaw Valley State University in Saginaw County.

== History ==
University Center was established with a post office in September 1961, which was meant to exclusively serve the higher-education institution of Delta College. In September 1964, the University Center post office was expanded to include Saginaw Valley State University.
