= Superior Dome =

Domed stadium on the campus of Northern Michigan University in Marquette, Michigan

Coordinates: 46°33′36″N 87°23′37″W

- YooperDome
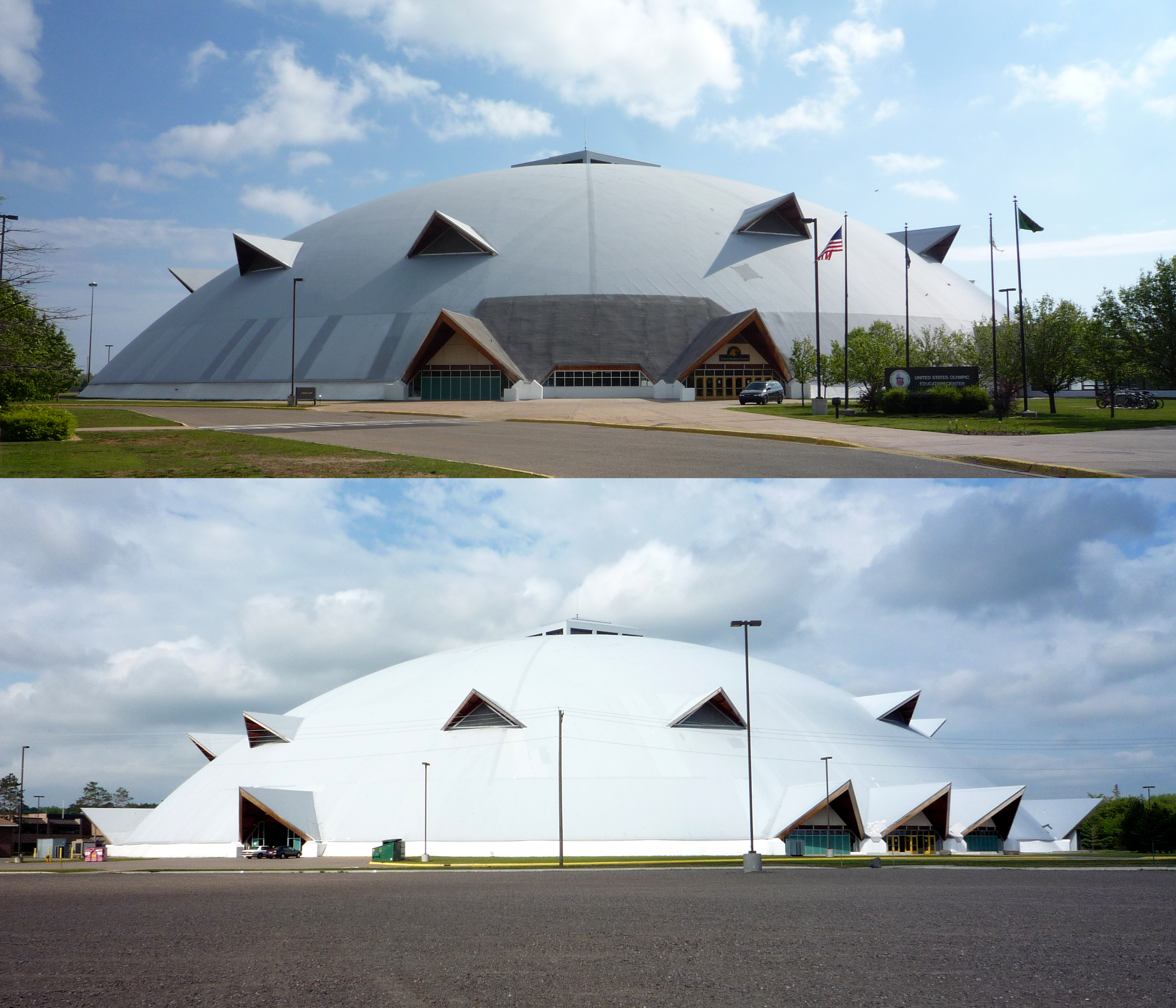
- Opposite sides of the Superior Dome
- Interactive map of Superior Dome
- Location: Northern Michigan University, Marquette, Michigan, United States
- Owner: Northern Michigan University
- Operator: Northern Michigan University
- Capacity: 8,000
- Surface: FieldTurf

Construction
- Groundbreaking: 1991
- Opened: 1991
- Cost: $23.9 million

Tenants
- Northern Michigan Wildcats (NCAA); Football 1991–present Women's lacrosse 2016–present Women's track and field 2003–present

The Superior Dome is a domed stadium on the campus of Northern Michigan University (NMU) in Marquette, Michigan, United States. It opened as the "world’s largest wooden dome" on September 14, 1991, and is home to the Northern Michigan Wildcats football, women's lacrosse, and women's track and field teams, the NMU Wildcat marching band, and hosts a variety of other campus and community events.

The dome is 143 feet (44 m) tall, has a diameter of 536 feet (163 m), covers an area of 5.1 acres (2.1 ha) and has a volume of 16,135,907 cubic feet (456,918.0 m^{3}). It is a geodesic dome constructed with 781 Douglas fir beams and 108.5 miles (174.6 km) of fir decking and is designed to support snow up to 60 pounds per square foot (2.9 kPa) and withstand 80-mile-per-hour (130 km/h) winds. It has a permanent seating capacity of 8,000 people, though the building can hold as many as 16,000 people. The 2010 edition of Guinness World Records listed it as the fifth-largest dome and largest wooden dome in the world.

== Construction ==
The construction was finished in two phases. Phase I was finished in August 1991 and included the construction of the domed complex. Phase II, completed in May 1995, added locker rooms, department offices, meeting rooms, concession areas, a retail store and other building amenities. Phase I of the project cost $21.8 million (equivalent to $44.6 million in 2024) and was funded entirely by the State of Michigan. Phase II was completed for $2.1 million, with $800,000 in private donations and $1.3 million in loans (equivalent to $3.94 million, $1.5 million, and $2.44 million in 2024, respectively). Total cost for the Superior Dome stands at $23.9 million (equivalent to $48.6 million in 2024). The general contractor for Phase 1 was R.E. Dailey & Company (Perini Corp.), Southfield, MI. The architect was TMP Associates, Bloomfield Hills, MI.

== Use ==
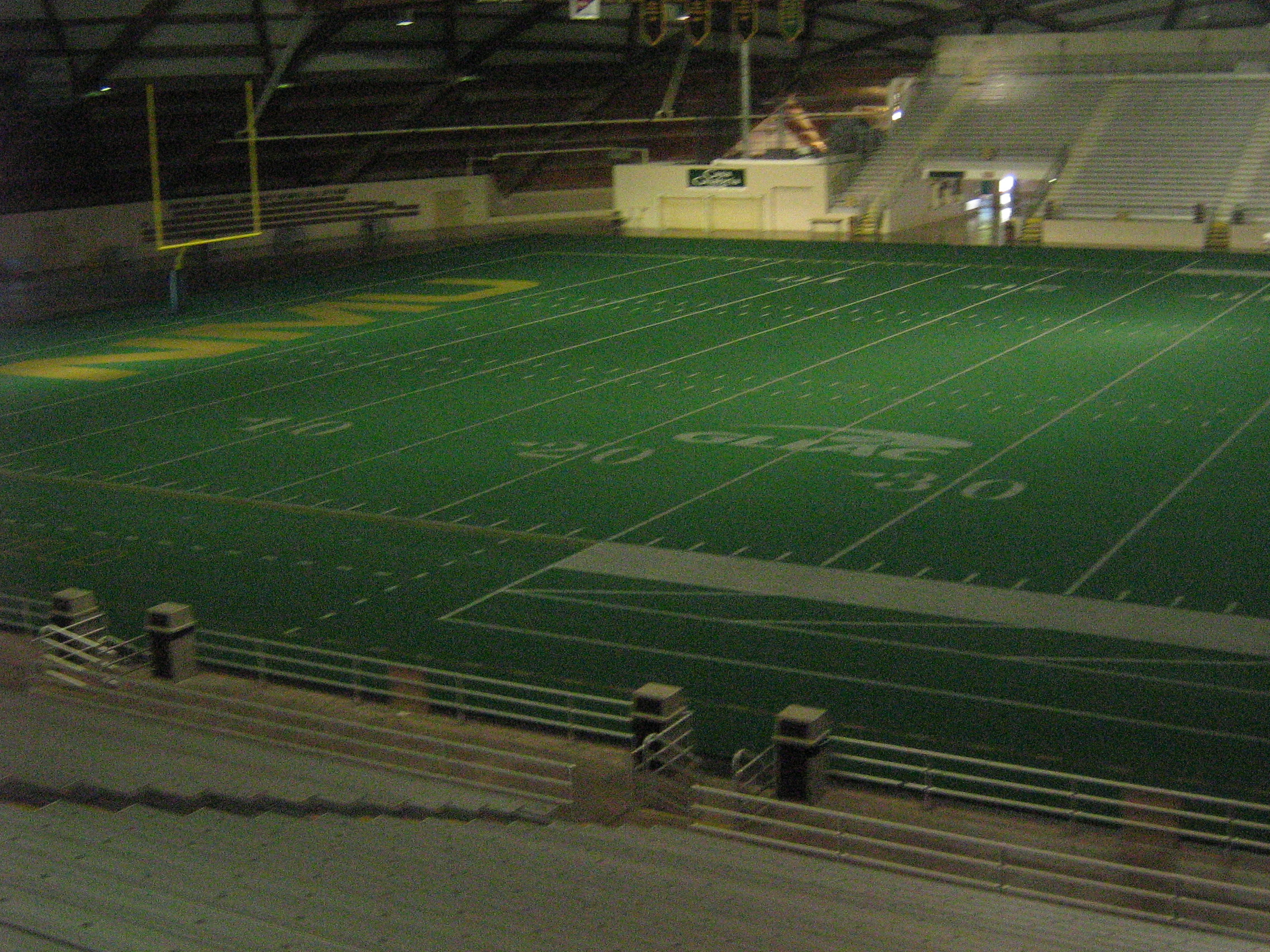
Inside of Superior Dome with turf laid out

The Wildcats football team was the first to christen the Dome, hosting the first event in the facility on September 14, 1991. Northern defeated Indianapolis, 31–20, in front of a crowd of 7,942. Later that season, a Superior Dome attendance record was set at 8,432, when Northern defeated Ferris State, 27–17, on October 5. On September 18, 2008, a new attendance record was set as 8,672 watched Northern lose to the Michigan Tech Huskies in a televised game.

The dome features a retractable artificial turf carpet, the largest of its kind in the world. When extended, the turf can accommodate football, soccer and field hockey. Underneath the carpet is a synthetic playing surface that features three basketball/volleyball courts, two tennis courts and a 200-meter (660 ft) track. The carpet is winched in and out of place on a cushion of air. Retracting the turf carpet takes 30 minutes, with full setup taking approximately two hours.

The Superior Dome is also host to a number of campus and community events, including the Michigan High School Athletic Association 8 man football championship games, Marquette Marathon, trade shows (approximately 100,000 square feet (9,300 m^{2}) of space), conventions, conferences, banquets, high school track meets, the Upper Peninsula "Band Day" competition/exhibition, Special Olympics and NMU's commencement exercises.

President George W. Bush held a campaign rally in the stadium during the 2004 Presidential campaign.

The Superior Dome was host to a historic exhibition basketball game on October 13, 2024, where Northern Michigan lost to Michigan State with a final score of 70–53. Known as the Superior Dome Showdown, this event was the first to ever be broadcast on the Big Ten Network from the Superior Dome. It was put on as a homecoming for the Spartans' head coach Tom Izzo, an alumnus of Northern Michigan, where his number 10 jersey was retired during the game. The dome was retrofitted with a basketball court and over 3,000 extra seats for the game and new attendance record was set with a sold-out audience of over 11,000.

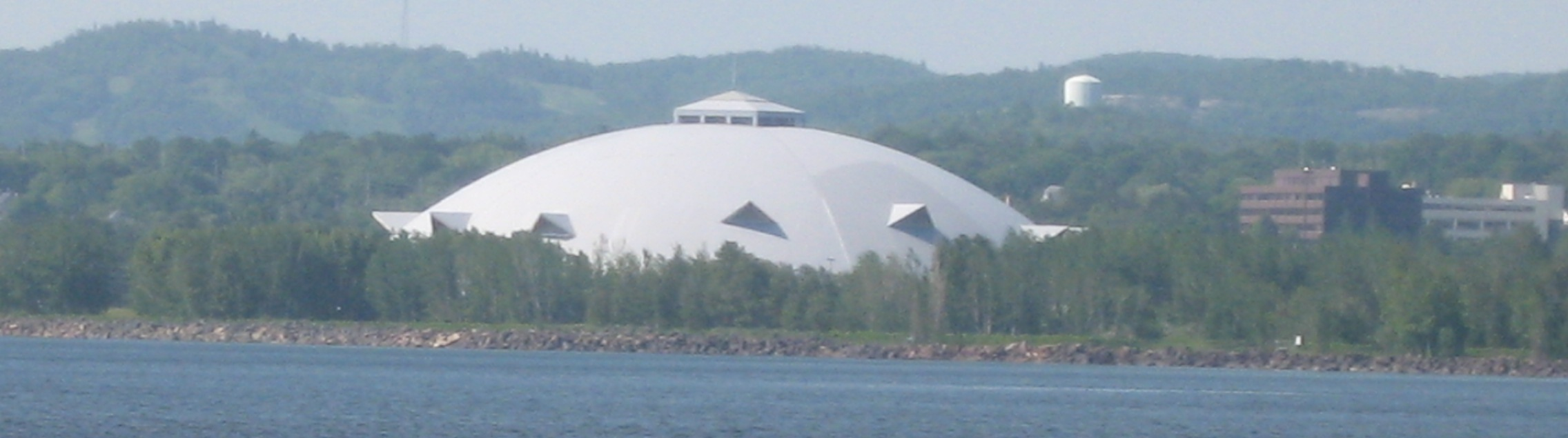
Superior Dome view from Lake Superior
