= Clint Conque =

American football player and coach (born 1961)

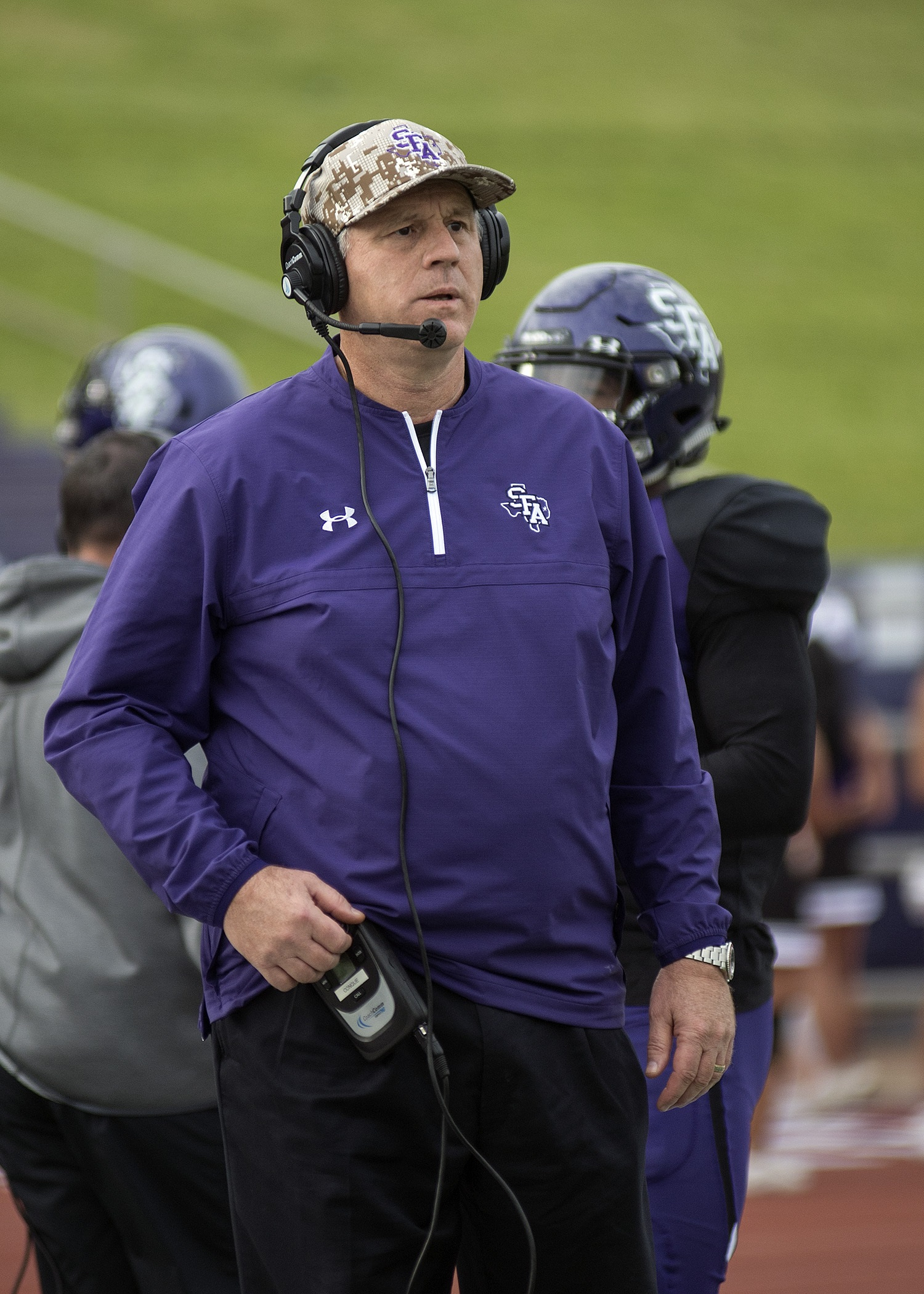

Biographical details
- Born: July 14, 1961 (age 65); Baton Rouge, Louisiana, U.S.

Playing career
- 1979–1980: Southwest Mississippi
- 1981–1982: Nicholls State
- 1983: Los Angeles Raiders
- Position: Linebacker

Coaching career (HC unless noted)
- 1984: Nicholls State (GA)
- 1985: Rayne HS (LA) (DC)
- 1986: St. Thomas More HS (LA) (OC)
- 1987–1989: McNeese State (LB/RB)
- 1990–1992: Samford (RB)
- 1993–1994: Louisiana Tech (RB/inside WR)
- 1995: Louisiana Tech (RB)
- 1996–1998: Louisiana Tech (ST/RB)
- 1999: Louisiana Tech (OC/RB)
- 2000–2013: Central Arkansas
- 2014–2017: Stephen F. Austin

Head coaching record
- Overall: 126–84

Accomplishments and honors

Championships
- 1 Gulf South (2005); 2 Southland (2008, 2012)

Awards
- GSC Coach of The Year (2005); 3x Southland Coach of the Year (2008, 2012, 2014); AFCA Regional Coach of the Year (2008); Nicholls State Hall of Fame (2005)

Clint Conque (born July 14, 1961) is an American former college football player and coach. Conque was the head football coach at the University of Central Arkansas (UCA) from 2000 to 2013 and Stephen F. Austin State University (SFA) from 2014 to 2017, compiling a career head coaching record of 126–84.

== Playing career ==
Conque played collegiately at Southwest Mississippi Community College and then Nicholls State University where he was named first-team Associated Press All-American in 1982. He played for the Los Angeles Raiders in the National Football League (NFL) in 1983.

== Coaching career ==
=== High school career ===
Conque was defensive coordinator at Rayne High School in Rayne, Louisiana in 1985 and offensive coordinator at St. Thomas More High School in Lafayette, Louisiana in 1986.

=== College career ===
==== Early career ====
Conque began his college coaching career as a graduate assistant at his alma mater, Nicholls State University in 1984. After spending two years at the high school level, he returned to college coaching as both a running backs and linebackers coach at McNeese State University from 1987 to 1989. In 1990, Conque moved to Samford University as running backs coach and held that position until 1992. In 1993, Conque became running backs and inside wide receivers coach at Louisiana Tech through 1994. In 1995, he dropped coaching inside wide receivers and continued to focus on coaching running backs. From 1996 to 1998, Conque added special teams coordinator to his role as running backs coach. In 1999, Conque became offensive coordinator along with being running backs coach.

==== Central Arkansas ====
Conque was head football coach at the University of Central Arkansas from 2000 to 2013, compiling a record of 105 wins and 59 losses. After Conque left for Stephen F. Austin, he was replaced as head football coach by Steve Campbell.

==== Stephen F. Austin ====
Conque was hired as head football coach at Stephen F. Austin State University (SFA) in December 2013. In his first season at SFA, Conque helped guide the Lumberjacks to an 8-5 record, a five-win improvement from the 3-9 mark during the 2013 season. Conque was 5-3 in Southland Conference games, including wins over sixth-ranked McNeese State and eighth-ranked Southeastern Louisiana, finishing tied for third. Conque was named the SLC Coach of the Year, leading the Lumberjacks to the FCS playoffs for the first time since 2010. He also helped mentor senior Gus Johnson to a record-setting year as Johnson was named the SLC Player of the Year and finished ninth in the Walter Payton Award voting.

On June 18, 2018, Conque was suspended indefinitely as the head coach at Stephen F. Austin State University. According to the university statement, "Stephen F. Austin State University has suspended head football coach Clint Conque pending an investigation into alleged violations of university policy. Jeff Byrd was named interim head coach.

Conque announced his resignation on August 6, 2018 stating “Although I have remained confident in the ongoing investigation into the potential violation of university policy, as a family of faith and out of respect to my profession, I do not want this situation to be a further distraction to the 2018 football team and season." He finished with a record of 21 wins and 25 losses at Stephen F. Austin.

== Head coaching record ==
Year	Team	Overall	Conference	Standing	Bowl/playoffs	Rank^{#}
Central Arkansas Bears (Gulf South Conference) (2000–2005)
2000	Central Arkansas	3–8	2–7	T–9th		
2001	Central Arkansas	9–3	7–2	T–2nd	L NCAA Division II First Round	14
2002	Central Arkansas	8–3	6–3	T–3rd		
2003	Central Arkansas	5–6	3–6	T–7th		
2004	Central Arkansas	8–3	6–3	T–3rd		
2005	Central Arkansas	11–3	8–1	1st	L NCAA Division II Quarterfinal	6
Central Arkansas Bears (NCAA Division I FCS independent) (2006)
2006	Central Arkansas	8–3				24
Central Arkansas Bears (Southland Conference) (2007–2013)
2007	Central Arkansas	6–5	5–2	T–2nd		
2008	Central Arkansas	10–2	6–1	1st		12
2009	Central Arkansas	5–7	4–3	T–6th		
2010	Central Arkansas	7–4	4–3	T–3rd		
2011	Central Arkansas	9–4	6–1	2nd	L NCAA Division I Second Round	14
2012	Central Arkansas	9–3	6–1	T–1st	L NCAA Division I Second Round	8
2013	Central Arkansas	7–5	4–3	T–3rd		
Central Arkansas:		105–59	75–39			
Stephen F. Austin Lumberjacks (Southland Conference) (2014–2017)
2014	Stephen F. Austin	8–5	5–3	T–3rd	L NCAA Division I First Round	
2015	Stephen F. Austin	4–7	4–5	T–5th		
2016	Stephen F. Austin	5–6	4–5	6th		
2017	Stephen F. Austin	4–7	4–5	T–6th		
Stephen F. Austin:		21–25	17–18			
Total:		126–84				
National championship Conference title Conference division title or championship game berth
