= Rod Broadway =

American football player and coach (born 1955)

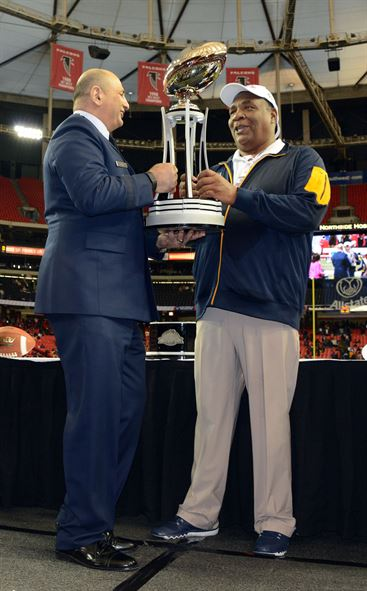
- Broadway accepting the 2015 Celebration Bowl trophy

Biographical details
- Born: April 9, 1955 (age 71); Oakboro, North Carolina, U.S.

Playing career
- 1974–1977: North Carolina
- Position: Defensive lineman

Coaching career (HC unless noted)
- 1979–1980: East Carolina (DL)
- 1981–1994: Duke (DL)
- 1995–2000: Florida (DL)
- 2001–2002: North Carolina (DL)
- 2003–2006: North Carolina Central
- 2007–2010: Grambling State
- 2011–2017: North Carolina A&T

Head coaching record
- Overall: 125–45
- Bowls: 2–0
- Tournaments: 0–2 (NCAA D-II playoffs); 0–1 (NCAA D-I playoffs)

Accomplishments and honors

Championships
- 5 Black college national (2005, 2006, 2008, 2015, 2017); 2 CIAA (2005–2006); 1 SWAC (2008); 3 MEAC (2014, 2015, 2017); 3 CIAA West Division (2004–2006); 3 SWAC West Division (2007–2008, 2010)

Awards
- MEAC Coach of the Year (2017); CIAA Coach of the Year (2006); First-team All-ACC (1977)

Roderick Craig Broadway (born April 9, 1955) is an American former college football coach. He served as the head football coach at North Carolina Central University from 2003 to 2006, Grambling State University from 2007 to 2010, and North Carolina Agricultural and Technical State University from 2011 to 2017, compiling a career head coaching record of 125–45. He is the only coach to win a black college football national championship at three different schools.

== Early life and playing career ==
Broadway was born April 9, 1955, in Oakboro, North Carolina, and attended West Stanly High School. A 1977 graduate of the University of North Carolina at Chapel Hill, Broadway played on the defensive line from 1974 to 1977. He helped lead the North Carolina Tar Heels to the 1974 Sun Bowl and the 1977 Liberty Bowl. Broadway earned All-Atlantic Coast Conference honors as a senior in 1977.

== Coaching career ==
Before taking over at Grambling, Broadway was as an assistant coach at the NCAA Division I-A level for 22 years. In 2002, he took over the struggling football program at North Carolina Central University (NCCU), then an NCAA Division II school in Durham, North Carolina. The school had gone 2–8 the year before Broadway took over. Broadway led North Carolina Central Eagles to Central Intercollegiate Athletic Association (CIAA) championships and black national championships, in 2005 and 2006. During his final three seasons at NCCU Broadway had a combined record of 29–4. He closed out his tenure at NCCU with a record of 33–11.

Broadway became the head football coach at Grambling State University in 2007. In his second year at Grambling State, he led the Tigers to an 11–2 record and the 2008 Southwestern Athletic Conference (SWAC) championship and black national championship.

On February 2, 2011, Broadway resigned from his position as head coach at Grambling State University, and the following day it was announced that he accepted the position of head coach at North Carolina A&T. Broadway, replaced Alonzo Lee who was in his second year at the position before his release. In 2015, he led the Aggies to Mid-Eastern Athletic Conference (MEAC) and black national titles.

In 2017, Broadway's NCA&T Aggies capped off a perfect season defeating the once-beaten Grambling Tigers in the Celebration to win another black national title. Broadway retired after the 2017 season.

While Broadway's background, as a coach and as a player, is rooted in defense, his teams at North Carolina Central and Grambling State were known for their explosive offenses.

== Personal life ==
In June 2004, Broadway's wife, Dianne, died after 14 years of battling scleroderma, a rheumatic disease of the connective tissues.

== Head coaching record ==
| Year | Team | Overall | Conference | Standing | Bowl/playoffs |
|---|---|---|---|---|---|
North Carolina Central Eagles (Central Intercollegiate Athletic Association) (2003–2006)
| 2003 | North Carolina Central | 4–6 | 2–5 | 5th (West) | |
| 2004 | North Carolina Central | 8–2 | 6–1 | T–1st (West) | |
| 2005 | North Carolina Central | 10–2 | 6–1 | 1st (West) | L NCAA Division II Second Round |
| 2006 | North Carolina Central | 11–1 | 7–0 | 1st (West) | L NCAA Division II Second Round |
| North Carolina Central: | | 33–11 | 21–7 | | |
Grambling State Tigers (Southwestern Athletic Conference) (2007–2010)
| 2007 | Grambling State | 8–4 | 8–1 | 1st (West) | |
| 2008 | Grambling State | 11–2 | 7–0 | 1st (West) | |
| 2009 | Grambling State | 7–4 | 5–2 | T–2nd (West) | |
| 2010 | Grambling State | 9–2 | 8–1 | T–1st (West) | |
| Grambling State: | | 35–12 | 28–4 | | |
North Carolina A&T Aggies (Mid-Eastern Athletic Conference) (2011–2017)
| 2011 | North Carolina A&T | 5–6 | 4–4 | T–6th | |
| 2012 | North Carolina A&T | 7–4 | 5–3 | T–3rd | |
| 2013 | North Carolina A&T | 7–4 | 4–4 | T–5th | |
| 2014 | North Carolina A&T | 9–3 | 6–2 | T–1st | |
| 2015 | North Carolina A&T | 10–2 | 7–1 | T–1st | W Celebration |
| 2016 | North Carolina A&T | 9–3 | 7–1 | 2nd | L NCAA Division I First Round |
| 2017 | North Carolina A&T | 12–0 | 8–0 | 1st | W Celebration |
| North Carolina A&T: | | 57–22 | 41–15 | | |
| Total: | | 125–45 | | | |
National championship Conference title Conference division title or championship game berth
