= North Carolina Central Eagles football =

College football team representing North Carolina Central University

2026 North Carolina Central Eagles football team
- First season: 1922; 104 years ago
- Head coach: Trei Oliver; 7th season, 45–25 (.643)
- Location: Durham, North Carolina
- Stadium: O'Kelly–Riddick Stadium (capacity: 10,000)
- NCAA division: Division I FCS
- Conference: MEAC
- Colors: Maroon and gray
- All-time record: 497–411–27 (.546)

Black college national championships
- 1954, 2005, 2006, 2022

Conference championships
- CIAA: 1953, 1954, 1956, 1961, 1963, 1980, 2005, 2006 MEAC: 1972, 1973, 2014, 2015, 2016, 2022, 2023
- Rivalries: North Carolina A&T (rivalry)
- Website: nccueaglepride.com

The North Carolina Central Eagles football program is a college football team representing North Carolina Central University. The Eagles play at the NCAA Division I Football Championship Subdivision (FCS) level as a member of the Mid-Eastern Athletic Conference.

== History ==
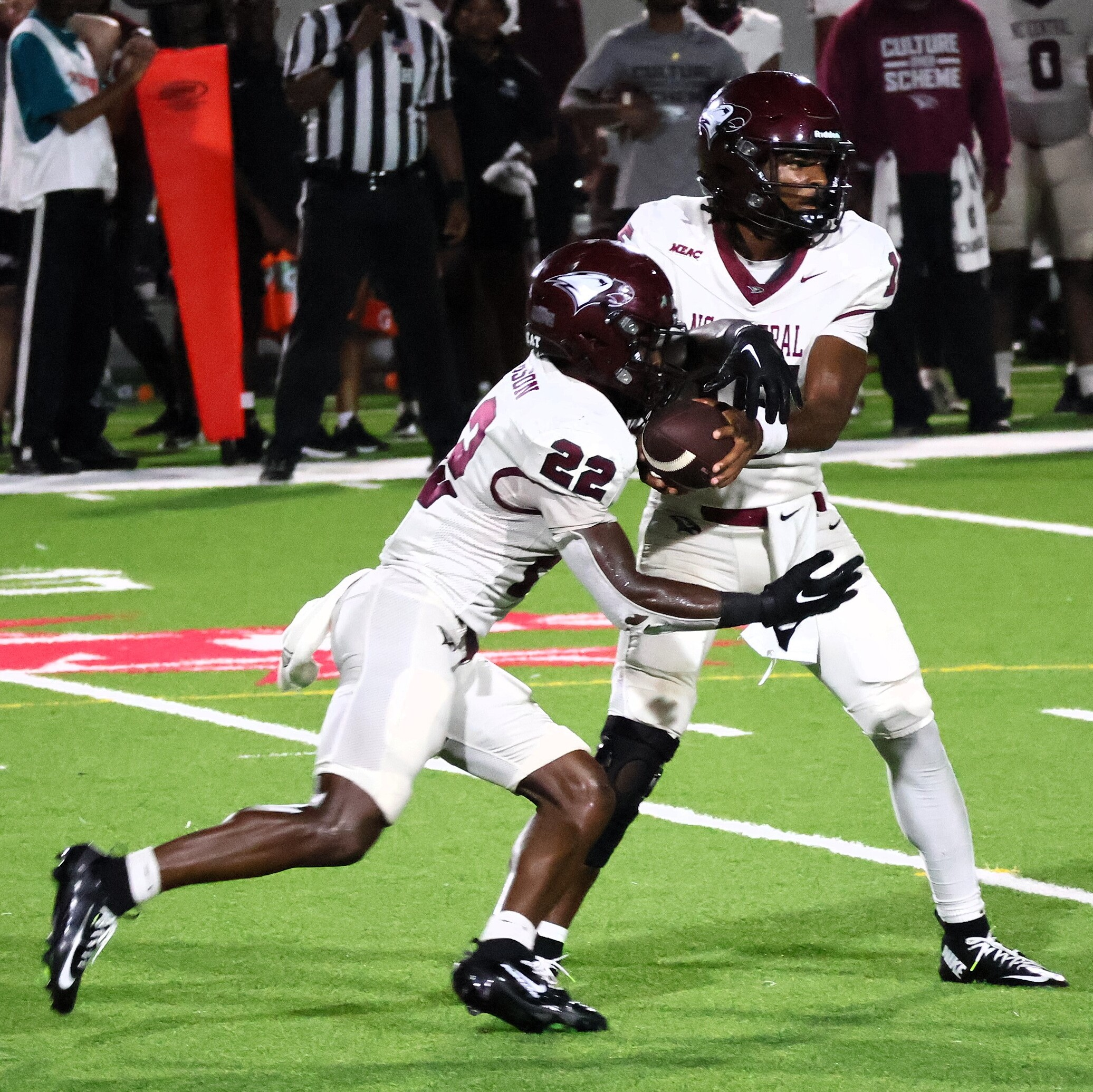
An Eagles football game in 2026

=== Classifications ===
- 1952–1972: NCAA College Division
- 1955–1969: NAIA
- 1970–1986: NAIA Division I
- 1973–2010: NCAA Division II
- 2011–present: NCAA Division I–AA/FCS

=== Conference memberships ===
- 1922–1927: Independent
- 1928–1970: Central Intercollegiate Athletic Association
- 1971–1978: Mid-Eastern Athletic Conference
- 1979–2006: Central Intercollegiate Athletic Association
- 2007–2009: NCAA Division II independent
- 2010–present: Mid-Eastern Athletic Conference

== Championships ==
=== National ===
Year	Championship	Coach	Overall record	Conference
1954	Black College National co-champions	Herman Riddick	7–1–1	CIAA
2005	Black College National DII Champions	Rod Broadway	10–2	CIAA
2006	Black College National co-champions	Rod Broadway	11–1	CIAA
2022	Black College National Champions	Trei Oliver	10–2	MEAC

=== Conference championships ===
North Carolina Central has won fifteen conference championships, five shared and ten outright.

Year	Conference	Coach	Overall record
1953	CIAA	Herman Riddick	5–3
1954	CIAA	Herman Riddick	7–1–1
1956*	CIAA	Herman Riddick	5–2–2
1961	CIAA	Herman Riddick	7–0–2
1963	CIAA	Herman Riddick	8–1
1972	MEAC	George Quiett	9–2
1973	MEAC	Willie Smith	7–4
1980	CIAA	Henry Lattimore	7–5
2005	CIAA	Rod Broadway	6–1
2006	CIAA	Rod Broadway	7–0
2014*	MEAC	Jerry Mack	7–5
2015*	MEAC	Jerry Mack	8–3
2016	MEAC	Jerry Mack	9–3
2022*	MEAC	Trei Oliver	10–2
2023*	MEAC	Trei Oliver	9–3

== Alumni in the NFL ==
Over 25 North Carolina Central alumni have played in the NFL, including:

- John Baker
- Louis Breeden
- William Frizzell
- Aaron B. Martin, Sr
- Robert Massey
- Greg Peterson
- Ryan Smith
- Ernie Warlick
- Doug Wilkerson

== Playoff appearances ==
=== NCAA Division I-AA/FCS ===
The Eagles have appeared in the Division I-AA/FCS playoffs one time, with a combined record of 0–1.

Year	Round	Opponent	Result
2023	First Round	Richmond	L, 27–49

=== NCAA Division II ===
The Eagles made three appearances in the Division II playoffs, with a combined record of 1–3.

Year	Round	Opponent	Result
1988	First Round; Quarterfinals	Winston-Salem State; Sacramento State	W, 31–16; L, 7–56
2005	Second Round	North Alabama	L, 21–24
2006	Second Round	Delta State	L, 17–24

== Future non-conference opponents ==
Announced schedules as of February 11, 2026

2026	2027	2028	2029	2030
at Texas Southern	vs North Carolina A&T (Charlotte, NC) (Duke's Mayo Classic)	North Carolina A&T	at North Carolina A&T	North Carolina A&T
Elizabeth State	Western Carolina	at Western Carolina		
North Carolina A&T	Florida A&M			
at Gardner–Webb				
at East Carolina				
Campbell				
William & Mary				
