= 2022 Howard Bison football team =

American college football season

2022 Howard Bison football

MEAC co-champion
- Conference: Mid-Eastern Athletic Conference
- Record: 5–6 (4–1 MEAC)
- Head coach: Larry Scott (3rd season)
- Offensive coordinator: Lee Hull (3rd season)
- Defensive coordinator: Troy Douglas (3rd season)
- Home stadium: William H. Greene Stadium

2022 Mid-Eastern Athletic Conference football standings
	Conf.			Overall
Team	W		L	W		L
North Carolina Central +	4	–	1	10	–	2
Howard +	4	–	1	5	–	6
Delaware State	2	–	3	5	–	6
Morgan State	2	–	3	4	–	7
Norfolk State	2	–	3	2	–	9
South Carolina State	1	–	4	3	–	8
+ – Conference co-champions; Rankings from STATS Poll

The 2022 Howard Bison football team represented Howard University as a member of the Mid-Eastern Athletic Conference (MEAC) during the 2022 NCAA Division I FCS football season. Led by third-year head coach Larry Scott, the Bison compiled an overall record of 5–6 with a mark of 4–1 in conference play, sharing the MEAC title with North Carolina Central. Howard played home games at William H. Greene Stadium in Washington, D.C.

They were champion of the MEAC for the first time since 1996, but they missed out on the Celebration Bowl in favor of NC Central.

== Schedule ==
Date	Time	Opponent	Site	TV	Result	Attendance
August 27	7:00 p.m.	vs. Alabama State*	Center Parc Stadium; Atlanta, GA (MEAC/SWAC Challenge)	ESPN	L 13–23	21,088
September 3	6:00 p.m.	at Hampton*	Armstrong Stadium; Hampton, VA (The Real HU)	FloSports	L 28–31	2,587
September 10	7:00 p.m.	at South Florida*	Raymond James Stadium; Tampa, FL	ESPN+	L 20–42	28,554
September 17	3:00 p.m.	vs. Morehouse*	MetLife Stadium; East Rutherford, NJ (HBCU New York City Football Classic)	CNBC	W 31–0	30,042
October 1	12:00 p.m.	at Yale*	Yale Bowl; New Haven, CT	ESPN+	L 26–34	9,200
October 15	4:00 p.m.	Harvard*	Audi Field; Washington, DC (Truth & Service Classic)	ESPN3	L 25–41	8,097
October 22	1:00 p.m.	Delaware State	William H. Greene Stadium; Washington, DC	ESPN+	W 35–17	7,495
October 29	2:00 p.m.	at Norfolk State	William "Dick" Price Stadium; Norfolk, VA	ESPN+	W 49–21	3,149
November 5	2:00 p.m.	at North Carolina Central	O'Kelly–Riddick Stadium; Durham, NC	ESPN3	L 21–50	14,322
November 12	1:00 p.m.	South Carolina State	William H. Greene Stadium; Washington, DC	ESPN3	W 28–14	4,787
November 19	12:00 p.m.	at Morgan State	Hughes Stadium; Baltimore, MD (rivalry)	ESPN3	W 35–6	
*Non-conference game; All times are in Eastern time

== Game summaries ==
=== Vs. Alabama State ===
	1	2	3	4	Total
Hornets	6	7	7	3	23
Bison	3	3	0	7	13

=== At Hampton ===
	1	2	3	4	Total
Bison	0	6	0	22	28
Pirates	0	14	7	10	31

=== At South Florida ===
	1	2	3	4	Total
Bison	7	0	7	6	20
Bulls	0	14	14	14	42

=== Vs. Morehouse ===
	1	2	3	4	Total
Maroon Tigers	0	0	0	0	0
Bison	0	0	10	21	31

=== At Yale ===
	1	2	3	4	Total
Bison	3	3	7	13	26
Bulldogs	0	17	10	7	34

=== Harvard ===
	1	2	3	4	Total
Crimson	10	7	14	10	41
Bison	0	17	0	8	25

=== Delaware State ===
	1	2	3	4	Total
Hornets	3	0	0	14	17
Bison	14	0	14	7	35

=== At Norfolk State ===
	1	2	3	4	Total
Bison	0	14	14	21	49
Spartans	7	0	7	7	21

=== At North Carolina Central ===
	1	2	3	4	Total
Bison	7	0	14	0	21
Eagles	22	0	21	7	50

=== South Carolina State ===
	1	2	3	4	Total
Bulldogs	7	0	0	7	14
Bison	7	14	7	0	28

=== At Morgan State ===
	1	2	3	4	Total
Bison	7	7	7	14	35
Bears	0	0	0	6	6
