= 2022 Charleston Southern Buccaneers football team =

American college football season

2022 Charleston Southern Buccaneers football
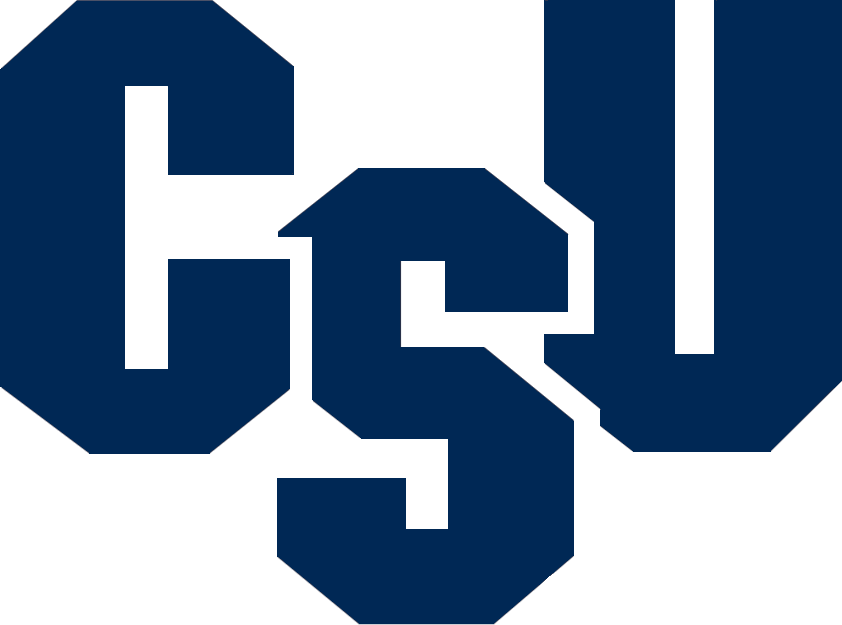
- Conference: Big South Conference
- Record: 2–8 (2–3 Big South)
- Head coach: Autry Denson (4th season)
- Offensive coordinator: Klay Koester (3rd season)
- Defensive coordinator: Zane Vance (6th season)
- Home stadium: Buccaneer Field

2022 Big South Conference football standings
	Conf.			Overall
Team	W		L	W		L
Gardner–Webb $^	5	–	0	7	–	6
North Carolina A&T	4	–	1	7	–	4
Campbell	2	–	3	5	–	6
Bryant	2	–	3	4	–	7
Charleston Southern	2	–	3	2	–	8
Robert Morris	0	–	5	0	–	11
$ – Conference champion; ^ – FCS playoff participant; Rankings from STATS Poll

The 2022 Charleston Southern Buccaneers football team represented Charleston Southern University as a member of the Big South Conference during the 2022 NCAA Division I FCS football season. Led by Autry Denson in his fourth and final season as head coach, the Buccaneers compiled an overall record of 2–8 with a mark of 2–3 in conference play, placing in a three-way tie for third in the Big South. Charleston Southern played home games at Buccaneer Field in Charleston, South Carolina.

== Schedule ==
Date	Time	Opponent	Site	TV	Result	Attendance
September 3	12:00 p.m.	Western Carolina*	Buccaneer Field; North Charleston, SC	ESPN+	L 38–52	3,922
September 10	12:30 p.m.	at No. 18 (FBS) NC State*	Carter–Finley Stadium; Raleigh, NC	ACCRSN	L 3–55	54,169
September 17	6:00 p.m.	at No. 19 Eastern Kentucky*	Roy Kidd Stadium; Richmond, KY	ESPN+	L 17–40	16,906
September 24	12:00 p.m.	Furman*	Buccaneer Field; Charleston, SC	ESPN+	L 19–24	3,715
October 8	4:00 p.m.	at Campbell	Barker–Lane Stadium; Buies Creek, NC	ESPN+	L 28–34	5,671
October 15	4:00 p.m.	at Bryant	Beirne Stadium; Smithfield, RI	ESPN3	W 24–23	2,158
October 22	6:00 p.m.	Gardner–Webb^{†}	Buccaneer Field; Charleston, SC	ESPN3	L 14–28	4,112
October 29	1:00 p.m.	at Kennesaw State*	Fifth Third Bank Stadium; Kennesaw, GA	ESPN+	L 20–30	3,845
November 5	12:00 p.m.	Robert Morris	Buccaneer Field; North Charleston, SC	ESPN3	W 34–21	3,033
November 12	12:00 p.m.	at North Carolina A&T	Truist Stadium; Greensboro, NC	ESPN+	L 10–20	10,234
*Non-conference game; ^{†}Homecoming; Rankings from STATS Poll released prior to the game; All times are in Eastern time

== Game summaries ==
=== Western Carolina ===
	1	2	3	4	Total
Catamounts	17	14	14	7	52
Buccaneers	7	10	14	7	38

=== At No. 18 (FBS) NC State ===
	1	2	3	4	Total
Buccaneers	0	0	3	0	3
No. 18 (FBS) Wolfpack	10	28	10	7	55

=== At No. 19 Eastern Kentucky ===
	1	2	3	4	Total
Buccaneers	0	10	0	7	17
No. 19 Colonels	16	0	17	7	40

=== Furman ===
	1	2	3	4	Total
Paladins	3	7	7	7	24
Buccaneers	7	2	10	0	19

=== At Campbell ===
	1	2	3	4	Total
Buccaneers	7	7	7	7	28
Fighting Camels	14	10	7	3	34

=== At Bryant ===
	1	2	3	4	Total
Buccaneers	3	7	7	7	24
Bulldogs	3	10	7	3	23

=== Gardner–Webb ===
	1	2	3	4	Total
Runnin’ Bulldogs	3	10	15	0	28
Buccaneers	7	0	7	0	14

=== At Kennesaw State ===
	1	2	3	4	Total
Buccaneers	0	7	7	6	20
Owls	3	10	7	10	30

=== Robert Morris ===
	1	2	3	4	Total
Colonials	0	7	7	7	21
Buccaneers	10	10	7	7	34

=== At North Carolina A&T ===
	1	2	3	4	Total
Buccaneers	0	7	3	0	10
Aggies	0	7	13	0	20
