= 2022 North Carolina Central Eagles football team =

American college football season

2022 North Carolina Central Eagles football

Black college national champion Celebration Bowl champion MEAC co-champion

Celebration Bowl, W 41–34 ^{OT}vs Jackson State
- Conference: Mid-Eastern Athletic Conference

Ranking
- STATS: No. 21
- FCS Coaches: No. 17
- Record: 10–2 (4–1 MEAC)
- Head coach: Trei Oliver (3rd season)
- Offensive coordinator: Matt Leone (2nd season)
- Defensive coordinator: Courtney Coard (1st season)
- Home stadium: O'Kelly–Riddick Stadium

2022 Mid-Eastern Athletic Conference football standings
	Conf.			Overall
Team	W		L	W		L
North Carolina Central +	4	–	1	10	–	2
Howard +	4	–	1	5	–	6
Delaware State	2	–	3	5	–	6
Morgan State	2	–	3	4	–	7
Norfolk State	2	–	3	2	–	9
South Carolina State	1	–	4	3	–	8
+ – Conference co-champions; Rankings from STATS Poll

The 2022 North Carolina Central Eagles football team represented North Carolina Central University as a member of the Mid-Eastern Athletic Conference (MEAC) during the 2022 NCAA Division I FCS football season. Led by third-year head coach Trei Oliver, the Eagles compiled an overall record of 10–2 with a mark of 4–1, sharing the MEAC title with Howard. North Carolina Central earned a berth in the Celebration Bowl, where the Eagle defeated Jackson State, 41–34, to win the fourth black college football national championship in program history. The team played home games at O'Kelly–Riddick Stadium in Durham, North Carolina.

== Schedule ==
Date	Time	Opponent	Rank	Site	TV	Result	Attendance
September 3	7:30 p.m.	vs. North Carolina A&T*		Bank of America Stadium; Charlotte, NC (Duke's Mayo Classic, rivalry)	ESPN3	W 28–13	35,798
September 10	6:00 p.m.	Winston-Salem State*		O'Kelly–Riddick Stadium; Durham, NC	ESPN+	W 41–0	3,731
September 17	6:00 p.m.	at No. 25 New Hampshire*		Wildcat Stadium; Durham, NH	FloSports	W 45–27	9,630
September 24	4:00 p.m.	Virginia–Lynchburg*	No. 25	O'Kelly–Riddick Stadium; Durham, NC	ESPN+	W 59–14	6,759
October 1	6:00 p.m.	at Campbell*		Barker–Lane Stadium; Buies Creek, NC	ESPN+	L 18–48	3,296
October 13	7:30 p.m.	Morgan State		O'Kelly–Riddick Stadium; Durham, NC	ESPN2	W 59–20	6,319
October 22	2:00 p.m.	at South Carolina State		Oliver C. Dawson Stadium; Orangeburg, SC	ESPN3	L 24–26	9,479
October 29	2:00 p.m.	at Delaware State		Alumni Stadium; Dover, DE	ESPN+	W 28–21	5,500
November 5	2:00 p.m.	Howard^{†}		O'Kelly–Riddick Stadium; Durham, NC	ESPN3	W 50–21	14,322
November 12	2:00 p.m.	at Norfolk State		William "Dick" Price Stadium; Norfolk, VA	ESPN+	W 48–14	2,933
November 19	2:30 p.m.	at Tennessee Tech*		Tucker Stadium; Cookeville, TN	ESPN3	W 22–20	4,969
December 17	12:00 p.m.	vs. No. 10 Jackson State*		Mercedes-Benz Stadium; Atlanta, GA (Celebration Bowl)	ABC	W 41–34 ^{OT}	49,670
*Non-conference game; ^{†}Homecoming; Rankings from STATS Poll released prior to the game; All times are in Eastern time

== Game summaries ==
=== vs North Carolina A&T ===
	1	2	3	4	Total
Eagles	7	14	7	0	28
Aggies	7	6	0	0	13

=== Winston-Salem State ===
	1	2	3	4	Total
Rams	0	0	0	0	0
Eagles	13	7	14	7	41

=== At No. 25 New Hampshire ===
	1	2	3	4	Total
Eagles	21	7	10	7	45
No. 25 Wildcats	7	14	0	6	27

=== Virginia–Lynchburg ===
	1	2	3	4	Total
Dragons	0	7	0	7	14
No. 25 Eagles	7	21	17	14	59

=== At Campbell ===
	1	2	3	4	Total
Eagles	0	6	0	12	18
Fighting Camels	10	24	0	14	48

=== Morgan State ===
	1	2	3	4	Total
Bears	7	6	0	7	20
Eagles	14	28	7	10	59

=== At South Carolina State ===
	1	2	3	4	Total
Eagles	7	7	10	0	24
Bulldogs	0	20	0	6	26

=== At Delaware State ===
	1	2	3	4	Total
Eagles	7	6	7	8	28
Hornets	3	6	12	0	21

=== Howard ===
	1	2	3	4	Total
Bison	7	0	14	0	21
Eagles	22	0	21	7	50

=== At Norfolk State ===
	1	2	3	4	Total
Eagles	0	28	6	14	48
Spartans	7	0	7	0	14

=== At Tennessee Tech ===
	1	2	3	4	Total
Eagles	10	3	0	9	22
Golden Eagles	0	7	7	6	20

=== Vs. No. 10 Jackson State ===
	1	2	3	4	OT	Total
Eagles	10	7	9	8	7	41
No. 10 Tigers	7	14	0	13	0	34
