= 2005 North Carolina Central Eagles football team =

American college football season

2005 North Carolina Central Eagles football

Black college national champion CIAA champion

CIAA Championship Game, W 26–23 vs. Bowie State

NCAA Division II Second Round, L 21–24 vs. North Alabama
- Conference: Central Intercollegiate Athletic Association
- Record: 10–2 (6–1 CIAA)
- Head coach: Rod Broadway (3rd season)
- Home stadium: O'Kelly–Riddick Stadium

2005 Central Intercollegiate Athletic Association football standings
	Conf.			Overall
Team	W		L	W		L
Eastern Division
Bowie State # xy	5	–	2	8	–	4
Virginia State x	5	–	2	6	–	4
Shaw	4	–	3	5	–	5
Saint Paul's	3	–	4	4	–	6
Virginia Union	2	–	5	3	–	7
Elizabeth City State	1	–	6	2	–	8
Western Division
No. 19 North Carolina Central xy$^	6	–	1	10	–	2
Winston-Salem State x	6	–	1	6	–	4
Fayetteville State	4	–	3	6	–	4
Livingstone	1	–	6	1	–	9
Johnson C. Smith	0	–	7	0	–	10
St. Augustine's *	0	–	2	0	–	2
Championship: North Carolina Central 26, Bowie State 23
$ – Conference champion; x – Division champion/co-champions; y – Championship game participant; ^ – NCAA Division II playoff participant; # – Pioneer Bowl participant * – St. Augustine's vacated 8 wins including 5 in conference play; Rankings from AFCA poll

The 2005 North Carolina Central Eagles football team represented North Carolina Central University as a member of the Central Intercollegiate Athletic Association (CIAA) during the 2005 NCAA Division II football season. Led by third-year head coach Rod Broadway, the Eagles compiled an overall record of 10–2 and a mark of 6–1 in conference play, finished as CIAA champion, and lost to North Alabama in the NCAA Division II Second Round. At the conclusion of the season, North Carolina Central were also recognized as black college national champion.

== Schedule ==
Date	Opponent	Site	Result	Attendance	Source
August 27	Edward Waters*	O'Kelly–Riddick Stadium; Durham, NC	W 70–12	7,235	
September 5	vs. North Carolina A&T*	Carter–Finley Stadium; Raleigh, NC (Aggie–Eagle Classic)	W 23–22	35,000	
September 10	at Lenoir–Rhyne*	Moretz Stadium; Hickory, NC	W 28–21 ^{OT}	8,561	
September 17	Shaw	O'Kelly–Riddick Stadium; Durham, NC	W 37–31	8,312	
September 24	Bowie State	O'Kelly–Riddick Stadium; Durham, NC	W 38–19	5,118	
October 2	St. Augustine's^{†}	O'Kelly–Riddick Stadium; Durham, NC	L 8–22	11,525	
October 7	Fayetteville State	O'Kelly–Riddick Stadium; Durham, NC	W 17–12	4,008	
October 15	at Winston-Salem State	Bowman Gray Stadium; Winston-Salem, NC	W 20–17		
October 22	Livingstone	O'Kelly–Riddick Stadium; Durham, NC	W 48–14		
October 29	at Johnson C. Smith	American Legion Memorial Stadium; Charlotte, NC	W 34–14		
November 5	Bowie State*	O'Kelly–Riddick Stadium; Durham, NC (CIAA Championship Game)	W 26–23		
November 19	North Alabama*	O'Kelly–Riddick Stadium; Durham, NC (NCAA Division II Second Round)	L 21–24		
*Non-conference game; ^{†}Homecoming
