= 2022 Bryant Bulldogs football team =

American college football season

2022 Bryant Bulldogs football
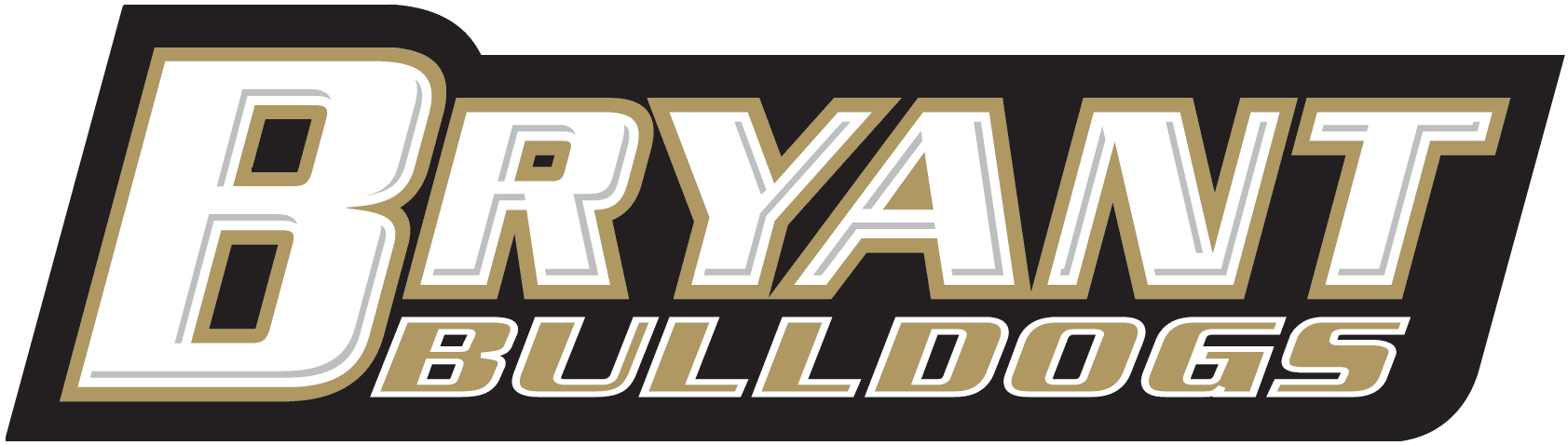
- Conference: Big South Conference
- Record: 4–7 (2–3 Big South)
- Head coach: Chris Merritt (4th season)
- Defensive coordinator: Anthony Barese (3rd season)
- Home stadium: Beirne Stadium

2022 Big South Conference football standings
	Conf.			Overall
Team	W		L	W		L
Gardner–Webb $^	5	–	0	7	–	6
North Carolina A&T	4	–	1	7	–	4
Campbell	2	–	3	5	–	6
Bryant	2	–	3	4	–	7
Charleston Southern	2	–	3	2	–	8
Robert Morris	0	–	5	0	–	11
$ – Conference champion; ^ – FCS playoff participant; Rankings from STATS Poll

The 2022 Bryant Bulldogs football team represented Bryant University as a first-year member of the Big South Conference in the 2022 NCAA Division I FCS football season. Led by fourth-year head coach Chris Merritt, the Bulldogs compiled an overall record of 4–7 with a mark of 2–3 in conference play, placing in a three-way tie for third in the Big South. Bryant played home games at Beirne Stadium in Smithfield, Rhode Island.

== Schedule ==
Date	Time	Opponent	Site	TV	Result	Attendance
September 1	7:00 p.m.	at FIU*	Riccardo Silva Stadium; Westchester, FL	ESPN3	L 37–38 ^{OT}	0
September 10	6:00 p.m.	No. 22 Rhode Island*	Beirne Stadium; Smithfield, RI	ESPN+	L 21–35	4,893
September 17	12:30 p.m.	at Brown*	Brown Stadium; Providence, RI	ESPN+	L 38–44 ^{2OT}	2,044
September 24	1:00 p.m.	at LIU*	Bethpage Federal Credit Union Stadium; Brookville, NY	NEC Front Row	W 31–29	1,134
October 1	7:00 p.m.	at North Carolina A&T	Truist Stadium; Greensboro, NC	ESPN3	L 13–24	7,004
October 8	1:00 p.m	Southern Connecticut*	Beirne Stadium; Smithfield, RI	ESPN+	W 56–10	1,765
October 15	4:00 p.m.	Charleston Southern	Beirne Stadium; Smithfield, RI	ESPN3	L 23–24	2,158
October 29	1:30 p.m.	at Gardner–Webb	Ernest W. Spangler Stadium; Boiling Springs, NC	ESPN+	L 40–48	
November 5	2:00 p.m.	Campbell	Beirne Stadium; Smithfield, RI	ESPN+	W 43–37	5,928
November 12	12:00 p.m.	at No. 5 Holy Cross*	Fitton Field; Worcester, MA	ESPN+	L 29–36	9,217
November 19	12:00 p.m.	at Robert Morris	Joe Walton Stadium; Moon, PA	ESPN3	W 35–6	
*Non-conference game; Rankings from STATS Poll released prior to the game; All times are in Eastern time

== Game summaries ==
=== at FIU ===
	1	2	3	4	OT	Total
Bulldogs	9	7	0	14	7	37
Panthers	0	6	0	24	8	38

Statistics	BRY	FIU
First downs	28	27
Total yards	470	377
Rushing yards	121	67
Passing yards	349	310
Turnovers	1	0
Time of possession	38:18	21:42

Team	Category	Player	Statistics
Bryant	Passing	Zevi Eckhaus	18/22, 243 yards, TD
Bryant	Rushing	Ishod Byarm	19 rushes, 48 yards, 2 TD
Bryant	Receiving	Anthony Frederick	3 receptions, 101 yards, TD
FIU	Passing	Grayson James	16/31, 207 yards, 4 TD
FIU	Rushing	EJ Wilson Jr.	11 rushes, 43 yards
FIU	Receiving	Tyrese Chambers	8 receptions, 86 yards, 2 TD

=== No. 22 Rhode Island ===
Game Two – No. 22 Rhode Island Rams (1–0) vs Bryant Bulldogs (0–1)

Quarter	1	2	3	4	Total
No. 22 Rhode Island	0	20	7	8	35
Bryant	7	7	0	7	21

at Beirne Stadium • Smithfield, Rhode Island

- Date: Saturday, September 10, 2022
- Game time: 6:00 p.m. EST
- Game weather: Temperature: 75 °F (24 °C) • Weather: Sunny
- Game attendance: 4,893
- Referee: Michael Jarosinski
- TV: ESPN+

Game information

First quarter

- (3:18) BRY – Derick Eugene 18 Yd Pass, Ethan Gettman Kick (Bryant 7–0)

Second quarter

- (14:57) URI – Jaylen Smith 1 Yd Run, Michael DeBolt PAT failed (Bryant 6–7)
- (12:54) URI – Ed Lee 78 Yd Pass, Harrison Leonard Kick (Rhode Island 13–7)
- (5:28) URI – Kahtero Summers 63 Yd Pass, Harrison Leonard Kick (Rhode Island 20–7)
- (0:40) BRY – Anthony White 7 Yd Pass, Ethan Gettman Kick (Rhode Island 20–14)

Third quarter

- (4:55) URI – Marques DeShields 16 Yd Run, Harrison Leonard Kick (Rhode Island 27–14)

Fourth quarter

- (8:55) URI – Jaylen Smith 50 Yd Run, Harrison Leonard PAT blocked (Rhode Island 33–14)
- (5:29) BRY – Matthew Prochasla 5 Yd Pass, Ethan Gettman Kick (Rhode Island 33–21)
- (2:06) URI – Team Safety (Rhode Island 35–21)

Statistics	URI	BRY
First downs	23	17
Plays–yards	61–502	66–264
Rushes–yards	212	-7
Passing yards	290	271
Passing: comp–att–int	14–20–1	22–37–0
Time of possession	32:09	27:51

Team	Category	Player	Statistics
Rhode Island	Passing	Kasim Hill	14/20, 290 yards, 2 TD, 1 INT
Rhode Island	Rushing	Marques DeShields	16 carries, 105 yards, 1 TD
Rhode Island	Receiving	Ed Lee	5 receptions, 135 yards, 1 TD
Bryant	Passing	Zevi Eckhaus	22/37, 271 yards, 3 TD
Bryant	Rushing	Ryan Clark	7 carry, 46 yards
Bryant	Receiving	David Zorrilla	4 receptions, 67 yards

=== at Brown ===
	1	2	3	4	OT	2OT	Total
Bulldogs	7	3	14	7	7	0	38
Bears	3	0	7	21	7	6	44

=== at LIU ===
	1	2	3	4	Total
Bulldogs	14	7	7	3	31
Sharks	7	6	7	9	29

=== at North Carolina A&T ===
	1	2	3	4	Total
Bulldogs	0	3	10	0	13
Aggies	14	0	3	7	24

=== Southern Connecticut ===
	1	2	3	4	Total
Owls	3	0	0	7	10
Bulldogs	7	21	7	21	56

=== Charleston Southern ===
	1	2	3	4	Total
Buccaneers	3	7	7	7	24
Bulldogs	3	10	7	3	23

=== at Gardner–Webb ===
	1	2	3	4	Total
Bulldogs	14	9	6	11	40
Runnin' Bulldogs	14	14	14	6	48

=== Campbell ===
	1	2	3	4	Total
Fighting Camels	3	7	6	21	37
Bulldogs	13	20	3	7	43

=== at No. 5 Holy Cross ===
	1	2	3	4	Total
Bulldogs	0	0	12	17	29
No. 5 Crusaders	12	10	7	7	36

=== at Robert Morris ===
	1	2	3	4	Total
Bulldogs	0	14	14	7	35
Colonials	0	0	0	6	6
