= 2022 Campbell Fighting Camels football team =

American college football season

2022 Campbell Fighting Camels football
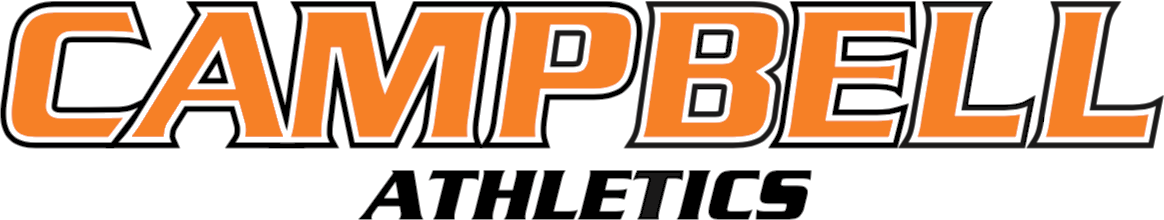
- Conference: Big South Conference
- Record: 5–6 (2–3 Big South)
- Head coach: Mike Minter (10th season)
- Offensive coordinator: Anthony Weeden (1st season)
- Co-defensive coordinators: Damien Adams (1st season); Reggie Howard (1st season)
- Home stadium: Barker–Lane Stadium

2022 Big South Conference football standings
	Conf.			Overall
Team	W		L	W		L
Gardner–Webb $^	5	–	0	7	–	6
North Carolina A&T	4	–	1	7	–	4
Campbell	2	–	3	5	–	6
Bryant	2	–	3	4	–	7
Charleston Southern	2	–	3	2	–	8
Robert Morris	0	–	5	0	–	11
$ – Conference champion; ^ – FCS playoff participant; Rankings from STATS Poll

The 2022 Campbell Fighting Camels football team represented the Campbell University as a member of the Big South Conference during the 2022 NCAA Division I FCS football season. Led by tenth-year head coach Mike Minter, the Fighting Camels played their home games at the Barker–Lane Stadium in Buies Creek, North Carolina.

== Schedule ==
Date	Time	Opponent	Site	TV	Result	Attendance
September 1	6:00 p.m.	The Citadel*	Barker–Lane Stadium; Buies Creek, NC	ESPN+	W 29–10	4,010
September 10	6:00 p.m.	at No. 20 William & Mary*	Zable Stadium; Williamsburg, VA	ESPN+	L 21–37	8,558
September 17	6:00 p.m.	at East Carolina*	Dowdy–Ficklen Stadium; Greenville, NC	ESPN+	L 10–49	43,036
October 1	12:00 p.m.	North Carolina Central*	Barker–Lane Stadium; Buies Creek, NC	ESPN+	W 48–18	3,296
October 8	4:00 p.m.	Charleston Southern	Barker–Lane Stadium; Buies Creek, NC	ESPN+	W 34–28	5,671
October 15	1:00 p.m.	Robert Morris	Barker–Lane Stadium; Buies Creek, NC	ESPN+	W 41–10	4,903
October 22	3:00 p.m.	at No. 9 Jackson State*	Mississippi Veterans Memorial Stadium; Jackson, MS	ESPN+	L 14–22	45,596
October 29	1:00 p.m.	at North Carolina A&T	Truist Stadium; Greensboro, NC	ESPN3	L 38–45	21,500
November 5	2:00 p.m.	at Bryant	Beirne Stadium; Smithfield, RI	ESPN+	L 37–43	5,928
November 12	1:00 p.m.	Gardner–Webb	Barker–Lane Stadium; Buies Creek, NC	ESPN3	L 35–42	4,586
November 19	2:00 p.m.	at Delaware State*	Alumni Stadium; Dover, DE	ESPN+	W 34–7	2,601
*Non-conference game; Rankings from STATS Poll released prior to the game; All times are in Eastern time

== Game summaries ==
=== The Citadel ===
	1	2	3	4	Total
Bulldogs	3	0	0	7	10
Fighting Camels	7	10	6	6	29

=== At No. 20 William & Mary ===
	1	2	3	4	Total
Fighting Camels	0	7	14	0	21
No. 20 Tribe	10	7	20	0	37

=== At East Carolina ===
Campbell Fighting Camels (1-1) vs East Carolina Pirates (1-1)

Quarter	1	2	3	4	Total
Fighting Camels	10	0	0	0	10
Pirates	7	14	21	7	49

at Dowdy–Ficklen Stadium
Greenville, NC

- Date: September 17th
- Game time: 6:00 p.m. EST
- Game weather: 80 °F (27 °C) • Weather: Sunny •
- Game attendance: 43,036
- Referee: Steve Anderson
- TV announcers (ESPN+): Ted Emrich, Jay Sonnhalter

Statistics	Campbell	East Carolina
First downs	21	28
Plays–yards	71–403	65–572
Rushes–yards	33–103	38–270
Passing yards	300	302
Passing: comp–att–int	23–38–1	22–27–0
Time of possession	30:52	29:08

Team	Category	Player	Statistics
Campbell	Passing	Hajj-Malik Williams	23−38, 300 yards, 1 TD, 1 INT
Campbell	Rushing	NaQuari Rogers	13 carries, 35 yards
Campbell	Receiving	Jalen Kelsey	3 receptions, 79 yards, 1 TD
East Carolina	Passing	Holton Ahlers	17−20, 263 yards, 3 TD
East Carolina	Rushing	Keaton Mitchell	13 carries, 185 yards, 1 TD
East Carolina	Receiving	Isaiah Winstead	6 receptions, 112 yards

Scoring summary

Quarter	Time	Drive			Team	Scoring information	Score	
Quarter	Time	Plays	Yards	TOP	Team	Scoring information	Campbell	East Carolina
							0	0
"TOP" = time of possession. For other American football terms, see Glossary of American football.							0	0

=== North Carolina Central ===
	1	2	3	4	Total
Eagles	0	6	0	12	18
Fighting Camels	10	24	0	14	48

=== Charleston Southern ===
	1	2	3	4	Total
Buccaneers	7	7	7	7	28
Fighting Camels	14	10	7	3	34

=== Robert Morris ===
	1	2	3	4	Total
Colonials	10	0	0	0	10
Fighting Camels	7	27	0	7	41

=== At No. 9 Jackson State ===
	1	2	3	4	Total
Fighting Camels	7	0	0	7	14
No. 9 Tigers	3	6	6	7	22

Statistics	CAM	JKST
First downs	13	20
Total yards	247	411
Rushing yards	110	178
Passing yards	137	233
Turnovers	1	2
Time of possession	27:06	32:54

Team	Category	Player	Statistics
Campbell	Passing	Hajj-Malik Williams	15/28, 131 yards, TD
Campbell	Rushing	Lamagea McDowell	9 carries, 48 yards
Campbell	Receiving	Julian Hill	4 receptions, 33 yards, TD
Jackson State	Passing	Shedeur Sanders	23/31, 233 yards, TD, INT
Jackson State	Rushing	Sy'veon Wilkerson	24 carries, 116 yards, TD
Jackson State	Receiving	Dallas Daniels	6 receptions, 63 yards

=== At North Carolina A&T ===
	1	2	3	4	Total
Fighting Camels	28	0	7	3	38
Aggies	10	0	20	15	45

=== At Bryant ===
	1	2	3	4	Total
Fighting Camels	3	7	6	21	37
Bulldogs	13	20	3	7	43

=== Gardner–Webb ===
	1	2	3	4	Total
Runnin' Bulldogs	14	21	7	0	42
Fighting Camels	0	14	14	7	35

=== At Delaware State ===
	1	2	3	4	Total
Fighting Camels	10	17	7	0	34
Hornets	0	0	0	7	7
