= 2005 West Texas A&M Buffaloes football team =

American college football season

2005 West Texas A&M Buffaloes football

LSC champion LSC South Division champion

NCAA Division II Second Round, L 3–41 vs. Pittsburg State
- Conference: Lone Star Conference
- South Division

Ranking
- AFCA: No. 15
- Record: 10–2 (8–1 LSC)
- Head coach: Don Carthel (1st season)
- Offensive coordinator: Lee Hays (3rd season)
- Offensive scheme: Air raid
- Defensive coordinator: Mike Salinas (1st season)
- Base defense: 3–4
- Home stadium: Kimbrough Memorial Stadium

2005 Lone Star Conference football standings
	Conf.			Overall
Team	W		L	W		L
Overall*
No. 15 West Texas A&M $^	8	–	1	10	–	2
SE Oklahoma State	7	–	2	8	–	2
No. 23 Angelo State ^	7	–	2	9	–	3
Tarleton State	6	–	3	7	–	3
Midwestern State	5	–	4	6	–	4
Texas A&M–Commerce	5	–	4	5	–	5
Texas A&M–Kingsville	5	–	4	6	–	4
Abilene Christian	4	–	5	4	–	6
Eastern New Mexico	4	–	5	5	–	6
Central Oklahoma	3	–	6	3	–	7
East Central	2	–	7	3	–	7
Northeastern State	2	–	7	2	–	8
SW Oklahoma State	0	–	9	1	–	10
North Division
SE Oklahoma State x	5	–	0	8	–	2
Texas A&M–Commerce	4	–	2	5	–	5
Central Oklahoma	2	–	3	3	–	7
East Central	2	–	3	3	–	7
Northeastern State	2	–	3	2	–	8
SW Oklahoma State	0	–	5	1	–	10
South Division
No. 15 West Texas A&M x$^	6	–	1	10	–	2
No. 23 Angelo State ^	4	–	2	9	–	3
Tarleton State	3	–	3	7	–	3
Midwestern State	3	–	3	6	–	4
Texas A&M–Kingsville	2	–	4	6	–	4
Abilene Christian	2	–	4	4	–	6
Eastern New Mexico	2	–	4	5	–	6
$ – Conference champion; ^ – NCAA Division II playoff participant; * – The LSC counted separate overall and division standings.; Rankings from AFCA Poll

The 2005 West Texas A&M Buffaloes football team represented West Texas A&M University in the 2005 NCAA Division II football season as a member of the Lone Star Conference (LSC). The Buffaloes were led by first-year head coach Don Carthel and played their games at Kimbrough Memorial Stadium in Canyon, Texas.

In Carthel's first year as head coach, the Buffaloes finished with an overall record of 10–2, going 8–1 in LSC play, winning the LSC's South Division and were named conference champions. West Texas A&M qualified for the NCAA Division II Football Championship playoffs, earning a first-round bye, but the Buffaloes were eliminated by No. 23 Pittsburg State, 41–3, in the second round.

== Offseason ==
=== Coaching changes ===
Head coach Ronnie Jones was suspended with pay on April 13, 2005, amid allegations that he had misused university resources for personal gain. Jones resigned as the Buffaloes' head coach on April 18 after a university investigation discovered that Jones was running a marketing business out of his office; offensive coordinator Lee Hays was named the team's interim head coach. In three years as the program's head coach, the Buffaloes went 0–11, 3–8, and 2–8 under Jones for an overall record of 5–27.

The university hired Don Carthel to replace Jones. Carthel had previously applied to be the Buffaloes' head coach in 2001, but Jones was selected over Carthel.

== Schedule ==
Date	Time	Opponent	Rank	Site	Result	Attendance	Source
August 25	8:00 p.m.	at New Mexico Highlands*		Perkins Stadium; Las Vegas, NM	W 90–21		
September 3	6:00 p.m.	East Central		Kimbrough Memorial Stadium; Canyon, TX	W 37–6		
September 10	6:00 p.m.	at No. 24 Central Oklahoma		Chad Richison Stadium; Edmond, OK	W 44–31		
September 17	6:00 p.m.	Southwestern Oklahoma		Kimbrough Memorial Stadium; Canyon, TX	W 41–14	8,599	
September 24	6:00 p.m.	No. 3 Texas A&M–Kingsville		Kimbrough Memorial Stadium; Canyon, TX	W 28–20	14,095	
October 1	7:00 p.m.	at Midwestern State	No. 22	Memorial Stadium; Wichita Falls, TX	W 47–44	7,883	
October 8	7:00 p.m.	Eastern New Mexico^{†}	No. 16	Kimbrough Memorial Stadium; Canyon, TX (Wagon Wheel)	W 52–51 ^{OT}	22,993^{^A}	
October 15	2:00 p.m.	at Abilene Christian	No. 10	Wildcat Stadium; Abilene, TX	W 40–24	10,000	
October 22	6:00 p.m.	Angelo State	No. 7	Kimbrough Memorial Stadium; Canyon, TX	L 53–58	17,127	
October 29	2:00 p.m.	at Texas A&M–Commerce	No. 13	Memorial Stadium; Commerce, TX (East Texas vs. West Texas)	W 19–17	1,246	
November 5	7:00 p.m.	at No. 22 Tarleton State	No. 12	Memorial Stadium; Stephenville, TX	W 30–26		
November 19	1:00 p.m.	No. 23 Pittsburg State*	No. 7	Kimbrough Memorial Stadium; Canyon, TX (NCAA Division II Second Round)	L 3–41	8,510	
*Non-conference game; ^{†}Homecoming; Rankings from AFCA Poll released prior to the game; All times are in Central time

- ^A Denotes the then largest crowd to watch a football game at Kimbrough Memorial Stadium. The record was later broken on October 13, 2007.

== Rankings ==
Ranking movements Legend: ██ Increase in ranking ██ Decrease in ranking — = Not ranked RV = Received votes
	Week												
Poll	Pre	1	2	3	4	5	6	7	8	9	10	11	Final
AFCA	—	—	—	RV	RV	22	16	10	7	13	12	7	15
