= 2022 Delaware State Hornets football team =

American college football season

2022 Delaware State Hornets football
- Conference: Mid-Eastern Athletic Conference
- Record: 5–6 (2–3 MEAC)
- Head coach: Rod Milstead (5th season)
- Offensive coordinator: Bryan Bossard (1st season)
- Defensive coordinator: Leandre Creamer (2nd season)
- Home stadium: Alumni Stadium

2022 Mid-Eastern Athletic Conference football standings
	Conf.			Overall
Team	W		L	W		L
North Carolina Central +	4	–	1	10	–	2
Howard +	4	–	1	5	–	6
Delaware State	2	–	3	5	–	6
Morgan State	2	–	3	4	–	7
Norfolk State	2	–	3	2	–	9
South Carolina State	1	–	4	3	–	8
+ – Conference co-champions; Rankings from STATS Poll

The 2022 Delaware State Hornets football team represented Delaware State University as a member of the Mid-Eastern Athletic Conference (MEAC) in the 2022 NCAA Division I FCS football season. The Hornets, led by fifth-year head coach Rod Milstead, played their home games at Alumni Stadium.

== Schedule ==
Date	Time	Opponent	Site	TV	Result	Attendance
September 3	2:00 p.m.	Lincoln (PA)*	Alumni Stadium; Dover, DE		W 34–0	3,400
September 10	6:00 p.m.	at No. 10 Delaware*	Delaware Stadium; Newark, DE (Route 1 Rivalry)	FloSports/NBC Sports Philadelphia	L 9–35	17,176
September 17	2:00 p.m.	Virginia–Lynchburg*	Alumni Stadium; Dover, DE	ESPN+	W 35–19	1,695
September 24	2:00 p.m.	Merrimack*	Alumni Stadium; Dover, DE	ESPN+	L 13–26	1,924
October 1	6:00 p.m.	Robert Morris*	Alumni Stadium; Dover, DE	ESPN+	W 14–9	
October 15	2:00 p.m.	at Norfolk State	William "Dick" Price Stadium; Norfolk, VA	ESPN+	W 28–7	22,478
October 22	1:00 p.m.	at Howard	William H. Greene Stadium; Washington, D.C.	ESPN+	L 17–35	7,495
October 29	2:00 p.m.	North Carolina Central^{†}	Alumni Stadium; Dover, DE	ESPN+	L 21–28	5,500
November 5	1:30 p.m.	at South Carolina State	Oliver C. Dawson Stadium; Orangeburg, SC	ESPN+	W 27–24 ^{OT}	6,200
November 12	2:00 p.m.	Morgan State	Alumni Stadium; Dover, DE	ESPN+	L 7–37	
November 19	2:00 p.m.	Campbell*	Alumni Stadium; Dover, DE	ESPN+	L 7–34	2,601
*Non-conference game; ^{†}Homecoming; Rankings from STATS Poll released prior to the game; All times are in Eastern time

== Game summaries ==
=== Lincoln (PA) ===
	1	2	3	4	Total
Lions	0	0	0	0	0
Hornets	7	3	7	17	34

=== At Delaware ===
	1	2	3	4	Total
Hornets	3	0	0	6	9
No. 10 Fightin' Blue Hens	7	7	14	7	35

=== Virginia–Lynchburg ===
	1	2	3	4	Total
Dragons	9	0	3	7	19
Hornets	14	14	0	7	35

=== Merrimack ===
	1	2	3	4	Total
Warriors	14	0	9	3	26
Hornets	0	3	3	7	13

=== Robert Morris ===
	1	2	3	4	Total
Colonials	3	0	0	6	9
Hornets	7	0	7	0	14

=== At Norfolk State ===
	1	2	3	4	Total
Hornets	7	7	7	7	28
Spartans	0	0	0	7	7

=== At Howard ===
	1	2	3	4	Total
Hornets	3	0	0	14	17
Bison	14	0	14	7	35

=== North Carolina Central ===
	1	2	3	4	Total
Eagles	7	6	7	8	28
Hornets	3	6	12	0	21

=== At South Carolina State ===
	1	2	3	4	OT	Total
Hornets	7	10	7	0	3	27
Bulldogs	0	7	7	10	0	24

=== Morgan State ===
	1	2	3	4	Total
Bears	6	10	14	7	37
Hornets	0	7	0	0	7

=== Campbell ===
	1	2	3	4	Total
Fighting Camels	10	17	7	0	34
Hornets	0	0	0	7	7
