= 2005 Central Arkansas Bears football team =

American college football season

2005 Central Arkansas Bears football

GSC champion

NCAA Division II quarterfinal, L 38–41 vs. North Alabama
- Conference: Gulf South Conference

Ranking
- AFCA: No. 6
- Record: 11–3 (8–1 GSC)
- Head coach: Clint Conque (6th season)
- Offensive coordinator: Brooks Hollingsworth (2nd season)
- Home stadium: Estes Stadium

2005 Gulf South Conference football standings
	Conf.			Overall
Team	W		L	W		L
No. 6 Central Arkansas $^	8	–	1	11	–	3
No. 4 North Alabama ^	7	–	2	11	–	3
No. 14 Valdosta State ^	7	–	2	9	–	3
West Georgia	7	–	2	7	–	4
Delta State	6	–	3	7	–	4
Arkansas Tech	6	–	3	7	–	3
Harding	4	–	5	6	–	5
Southern Arkansas	4	–	5	6	–	5
Henderson State	2	–	7	3	–	8
Ouachita Baptist	2	–	7	2	–	8
Arkansas–Monticello	1	–	8	1	–	10
West Alabama	0	–	9	2	–	9
$ – Conference champion; ^ – NCAA Division II playoff participant; Rankings from AFCA poll

The 2005 Central Arkansas Bears football team represented the University of Central Arkansas as a member of the Gulf South Conference (GSC) during the 2005 NCAA Division II football season. Led by sixth-year head coach Clint Conque, the Bears compiled a record of 11–3 with a mark of 8–1 in conference play, and finished as GSC champion. The Bears advanced to the NCAA Division II playoffs and lost to North Alabama in the quarterfinal. Central Arkansas played home games at Estes Stadium in Conway, Arkansas.

== Schedule ==
Date	Time	Opponent	Rank	Site	Result	Attendance
August 25	7:00 p.m.	vs. Eastern New Mexico*		War Memorial Stadium; Little Rock, AR	W 51–0	7,524
September 1	5:30 p.m.	at Tennessee–Martin*		Graham Stadium; Martin, TN	L 34–35	5,014
September 10	6:00 p.m.	Southern Arkansas		Estes Stadium; Conway, AR	W 31–7	8,364
September 17	6:00 p.m.	Henderson State		Estes Stadium; Conway, AR	W 55–7	7,132
September 24	6:00 p.m.	at No. 8 Valdosta State		Bazemore-Hyder Stadium; Valdosta, GA	L 7–12	4,358
September 29	7:05 p.m.	North Alabama		Estes Stadium; Conway, AR	W 29–26 ^{OT}	6,654
October 8	6:00 p.m.	at Harding		First Security Stadium; Searcy, AR	W 41–21	6,249
October 15	6:00 p.m.	Delta State	No. 25	Estes Stadium; Conway, AR	W 41–31	8,874
October 22	1:30 p.m.	at Ouachita Baptist	No. 23	Williams Field; Arkadelphia, AR	W 51–6	5,629
October 29	6:00 p.m.	Arkansas–Monticello	No. 21	Estes Stadium; Conway, AR	W 56–7	6,582
November 3	7:05 p.m.	at No. 20 Arkansas Tech	No. 19	Buerkle Field; Russellville, AR	W 49–17	8,859
November 12	11:00 a.m.	at Albany State*		Albany State University Coliseum; Albany, GA (NCAA Division II first round)	W 28–20	4,977
November 19	11:00 a.m.	at No. 5 Presbyterian*	No. 15	Bailey Memorial Stadium; Clinton, SC (NCAA Division II second round)	W 52–28	5,578
November 26	1:00 p.m.	No. 13 North Alabama*	No. 15	Estes Stadium; Conway, AR (NCAA Division II quarterfinal)	L 38–41 ^{OT}	6,355
*Non-conference game; Rankings from AFCA Poll released prior to the game; All times are in Central time

== Game summaries ==
=== vs. Eastern New Mexico ===
	1	2	3	4	Total
Greyhounds	0	0	0	0	0
Bears	17	10	14	10	51

=== at Tennessee–Martin ===
	1	2	3	4	Total
Bears	13	6	7	8	34
Skyhawks	7	14	7	7	35

=== Southern Arkansas ===
	1	2	3	4	Total
Muleriders	0	0	0	7	7
Bears	7	3	21	0	31

=== Henderson State ===
	1	2	3	4	Total
Reddies	0	7	0	0	7
Bears	6	28	7	14	55

=== at No. 8 Valdosta State ===
	1	2	3	4	Total
Bears	0	0	7	0	7
No. 8 Blazers	0	10	2	0	12

=== North Alabama ===
	1	2	3	4	OT	Total
Lions	7	13	0	3	3	26
Bears	16	7	0	0	6	29

=== at Harding ===
	1	2	3	4	Total
Bears	0	6	21	14	41
Bisons	0	14	0	7	21

=== Delta State ===
	1	2	3	4	Total
Statesmen	14	7	7	3	31
No. 25 Bears	7	10	9	15	41

=== at Ouachita Baptist ===
	1	2	3	4	Total
No. 23 Bears	13	14	17	7	51
Tigers	0	6	0	0	6

=== Arkansas–Monticello ===
	1	2	3	4	Total
Boll Weevils	0	0	0	7	7
No. 21 Bears	28	14	7	7	56

=== at No. 20 Arkansas Tech ===
	1	2	3	4	Total
No. 19 Bears	14	7	14	14	49
No. 20 Wonder Boys	3	0	0	14	17

=== at Albany State ===
	1	2	3	4	Total
Bears	0	14	14	0	28
Golden Rams	7	7	0	6	20

=== at No. 5 Presbyterian ===
	1	2	3	4	Total
No. 15 Bears	21	14	7	10	52
No. 5 Blue Hose	14	0	14	0	28

=== No. 13 North Alabama ===
	1	2	3	4	OT	Total
No. 13 Lions	14	14	0	10	3	41
No. 15 Bears	0	14	10	14	0	38
