= 2006 North Carolina Central Eagles football team =

American college football season

2006 North Carolina Central Eagles football

Black college national champion CIAA champion

CIAA Championship Game, W 17–14 vs. Elizabeth City State

NCAA Division II Second Round, L 17–24 vs. Delta State
- Conference: Central Intercollegiate Athletic Association
- Record: 11–1 (7–0 CIAA)
- Head coach: Rod Broadway (4th season)
- Offensive coordinator: Mose Rison (1st season)
- Home stadium: O'Kelly–Riddick Stadium

2006 Central Intercollegiate Athletic Association football standings
	Conf.			Overall
Team	W		L	W		L
Eastern Division
No. 21 Elizabeth City State xy^	7	–	0	9	–	3
Virginia Union	5	–	2	7	–	3
Bowie State	3	–	4	5	–	5
Shaw	2	–	5	3	–	7
Virginia State	2	–	5	2	–	8
Saint Paul's	1	–	6	2	–	8
Western Division
No. 9 North Carolina Central xy$^	7	–	0	11	–	1
Johnson C. Smith #	4	–	3	7	–	4
St. Augustine's †	4	–	3	4	–	6
Fayetteville State	2	–	5	3	–	7
Livingstone	1	–	6	1	–	9
Championship: North Carolina Central 17, Elizabeth City State 14
$ – Conference champion; x – Division champion/co-champions; y – Championship game participant; ^ – NCAA Division II playoff participant; # – Pioneer Bowl participant † – St. Augustine's vacated all four wins; Rankings from AFCA poll

The 2006 North Carolina Central Eagles football team represented North Carolina Central University as a member of the Central Intercollegiate Athletic Association (CIAA) during the 2006 NCAA Division II football season. Led by fourth-year head coach Rod Broadway, the Eagles compiled an overall record of 11–1 and a mark of 7–0 in conference play, finished as CIAA champion, and lost to Delta State in the NCAA Division II Second Round. At the conclusion of the season, North Carolina Central were also recognized as black college national champion.

== Schedule ==
Date	Opponent	Site	Result	Attendance	Source
August 26	Albany State*	O'Kelly–Riddick Stadium; Durham, NC	W 20–0	8,027	
September 3	Shaw	O'Kelly–Riddick Stadium; Durham, NC	W 21–12	10,103	
September 9	Lenoir–Rhyne*	O'Kelly–Riddick Stadium; Durham, NC	W 38–16		
September 23	at Southern*	A. W. Mumford Stadium; Baton Rouge, LA	W 27–20	12,845	
September 30	at Bowie State	Bulldogs Stadium; Bowie, MD	W 35–13		
October 7	at St. Augustine's	George Williams Athletic Complex; Raleigh, NC	W 27–18	2,377	
October 14	at Fayetteville State	Luther "Nick" Jeralds Stadium; Fayetteville, NC	W 49–6	3,298	
October 21	Langston*	O'Kelly–Riddick Stadium; Durham, NC	W 31–21		
October 28	at Livingstone	Alumni Memorial Stadium; Salisbury, NC	W 37–15	5,525	
November 4	Johnson C. Smith	O'Kelly–Riddick Stadium; Durham, NC	W 52–7		
November 11	Elizabeth City State*	O'Kelly–Riddick Stadium; Durham, NC (CIAA Championship Game)	W 17–14		
November 25	Delta State*	O'Kelly–Riddick Stadium; Durham, NC (NCAA Division II Second Round)	L 17–24	4,386	
*Non-conference game
