= 2022 Norfolk State Spartans football team =

American college football season

2022 Norfolk State Spartans football
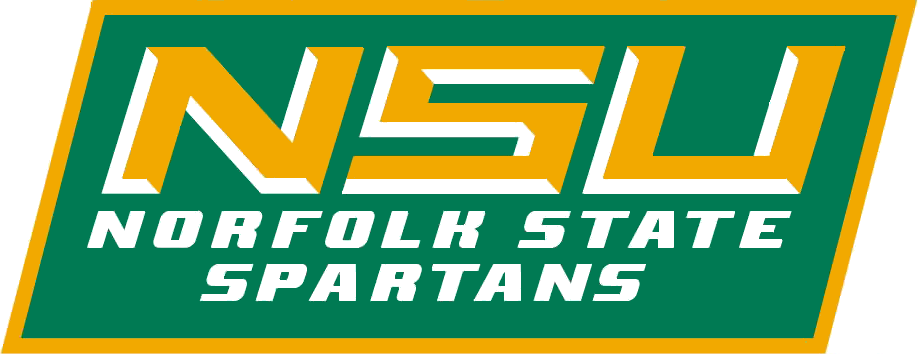
- Conference: Mid-Eastern Athletic Conference
- Record: 2–9 (2–3 MEAC)
- Head coach: Dawson Odums (2nd season)
- Offensive coordinator: Ryan Meyers (1st season)
- Defensive coordinator: Steve Adams (2nd season)
- Home stadium: William "Dick" Price Stadium

2022 Mid-Eastern Athletic Conference football standings
| | Conf. | | | Overall |
| Team | W | | L | W | | L |
|---|---|---|---|---|---|---|
| North Carolina Central + | 4 | – | 1 | 10 | – | 2 |
| Howard + | 4 | – | 1 | 5 | – | 6 |
| Delaware State | 2 | – | 3 | 5 | – | 6 |
| Morgan State | 2 | – | 3 | 4 | – | 7 |
| Norfolk State | 2 | – | 3 | 2 | – | 9 |
| South Carolina State | 1 | – | 4 | 3 | – | 8 |
+ – Conference co-champions; Rankings from STATS Poll

The 2022 Norfolk State Spartans football team represented Norfolk State University as a member of the Mid-Eastern Athletic Conference (MEAC) during the 2022 NCAA Division I FCS football season. The Spartans, led by second-year head coach Dawson Odums, played their home games at William "Dick" Price Stadium.

== Schedule ==
| Date | Time | Opponent | Site | TV | Result | Attendance |
|---|---|---|---|---|---|---|
| September 3 | 3:30 p.m. | at Marshall* | Joan C. Edwards Stadium; Huntington, WV | ESPN3 | L 3–55 | 24,607 |
| September 10 | 4:00 p.m. | at James Madison* | Bridgeforth Stadium; Harrisonburg, VA | ESPN3 | L 7–63 | 23,928 |
| September 17 | 2:00 p.m. | Hampton* | William "Dick" Price Stadium; Norfolk, VA (Battle of the Bay) | ESPN+ | L 7–17 | 15,459 |
| September 24 | 2:00 p.m. | Saint Francis (PA)* | William "Dick" Price Stadium; Norfolk, VA | ESPN+ | L 26–45 | 3,835 |
| October 1 | 1:00 p.m. | at Sacred Heart* | Campus Field; Fairfield, CT | NEC Front Row | L 14–31 | 0 |
| October 8 | 1:00 p.m. | at Morgan State | Hughes Stadium; Baltimore, MD | ESPN+ | W 24–21 | 10,200 |
| October 15 | 2:00 p.m. | Delaware State^{†} | William "Dick" Price Stadium; Norfolk, VA | ESPN+ | L 7–28 | 22,478 |
| October 29 | 2:00 p.m. | Howard | William "Dick" Price Stadium; Norfolk, VA | ESPN+ | L 21–49 | 3,149 |
| November 5 | 12:00 p.m. | at North Carolina A&T* | Truist Stadium; Greensboro, NC | ESPN+ | L 24–49 | 13,883 |
| November 12 | 2:00 p.m. | North Carolina Central | William "Dick" Price Stadium; Norfolk, VA | ESPN+ | L 14–48 | 2,933 |
| November 19 | 1:30 p.m. | at South Carolina State | Oliver C. Dawson Stadium; Orangeburg, SC | ESPN+ | W 42–38 | |
*Non-conference game; ^{†}Homecoming; All times are in Eastern time

== Game summaries ==
=== at Marshall ===
Game One – Norfolk State Spartans (0–0) at Marshall Thundering Herd (0–0)

| Quarter | 1 | 2 | 3 | 4 | Total |
|---|---|---|---|---|---|
| Spartans | 0 | 0 | 3 | 0 | 3 |
| Thundering Herd | 10 | 28 | 17 | 0 | 55 |

at Joan C. Edwards Stadium • Huntington, West Virginia

- Date: Saturday, September 3, 2022
- Game time: 3:30 p.m. EDT
- Game weather: Sunny • Temperature: 84 °F (29 °C) • Wind: None
- Game attendance: 24,607
- Referee: Jeremy Parker
- TV announcers (ESPN3): Chad Bush (play-by-play), Doug Chapman (analyst)

Game information

First quarter

- (9:32) MRSH – Rece Verhoff 30 yard field goal (Drive: 7 plays, 32 yards, 2:46; Marshall 3–0)
- (6:57) MRSH – Ethan Payne 45 yard run, Rece Verhoff kick (Drive: 3 plays, 55 yards, 0:58; Marshall 10–0)

Second quarter

- (10:14) MRSH – Khalan Laborn 4 yard run, Rece Verhoff kick (Drive: 11 plays, 72 yards, 3:59; Marshall 17–0)
- (8:52) MRSH – Owen Porter 21 yard fumble recovery, Rece Verhoff kick (Marshall 24–0)
- (3:43) MRSH – Corey Gammage 13 yard pass from Henry Colombi, Rece Verhoff kick (Drive: 7 plays, 72 yards, 2:09; Marshall 31–0)
- (0:30) MRSH – Ethan Payne 7 yard run, Rece Verhoff kick (Drive: 7 plays, 55 yards, 2:20; Marshall 38–0)

Third quarter

- (12:17) MRSH – Khalan Laborn 23 yard run, Rece Verhoff kick (Drive: 4 plays, 51 yards, 1:12; Marshall 45–0)
- (10:00) MRSH – Toby Payne 12 yard pass from Cam Fancher, Rece Verhoff kick (Drive: 3 plays, 40 yards, 1:09; Marshall 52–0)
- (5:19) MRSH – Rece Verhoff 27 yard field goal (Drive: 7 plays, 48 yards, 2:27; Marshall 55–0)
- (0:38) NORF – Grandin Willcox 25 yard field goal (Drive: 9 plays, 56 yards, 4:41; Marshall 55–3)

| Statistics | NORF | MRSH |
|---|---|---|
| First downs | 5 | 33 |
| Plays–yards | 45–114 | 81–612 |
| Rushes–yards | 31–30 | 51–380 |
| Passing yards | 84 | 232 |
| Passing: comp–att–int | 6–14–1 | 26–30–1 |
| Time of possession | 23:51 | 36:09 |

| Team | Category | Player | Statistics |
|---|---|---|---|
| Norfolk State | Passing | Jaylan Adams | 3/4, 54 yards |
| Norfolk State | Rushing | Jaylen White | 4 carries, 15 yards |
| Norfolk State | Receiving | Jason Wonodi | 2 receptions, 50 yards |
| Marshall | Passing | Henry Colombi | 24/26, 205 yards, 1 TD, 1 INT |
| Marshall | Rushing | Ethan Payne | 10 carries, 113 yards, 2 TD |
| Marshall | Receiving | Talik Keaton | 8 receptions, 71 yards |

=== At James Madison ===
| | 1 | 2 | 3 | 4 | Total |
|---|---|---|---|---|---|
| Spartans | 0 | 0 | 7 | 0 | 7 |
| Dukes | 21 | 14 | 21 | 7 | 63 |

=== Hampton ===
| | 1 | 2 | 3 | 4 | Total |
|---|---|---|---|---|---|
| Pirates | 7 | 0 | 7 | 3 | 17 |
| Spartans | 7 | 0 | 0 | 0 | 7 |

=== Saint Francis (PA) ===
| | 1 | 2 | 3 | 4 | Total |
|---|---|---|---|---|---|
| Red Flash | 21 | 14 | 0 | 10 | 45 |
| Spartans | 0 | 12 | 7 | 7 | 26 |

=== At Sacred Heart ===
| | 1 | 2 | 3 | 4 | Total |
|---|---|---|---|---|---|
| Spartans | 7 | 7 | 0 | 0 | 14 |
| Pioneers | 7 | 10 | 7 | 7 | 31 |

=== At Morgan State ===
| | 1 | 2 | 3 | 4 | Total |
|---|---|---|---|---|---|
| Spartans | 7 | 10 | 0 | 7 | 24 |
| Bears | 0 | 7 | 0 | 14 | 21 |

=== Delaware State ===
| | 1 | 2 | 3 | 4 | Total |
|---|---|---|---|---|---|
| Hornets | 7 | 7 | 7 | 7 | 28 |
| Spartans | 0 | 0 | 0 | 7 | 7 |

=== Howard ===
| | 1 | 2 | 3 | 4 | Total |
|---|---|---|---|---|---|
| Bison | 0 | 14 | 14 | 21 | 49 |
| Spartans | 7 | 0 | 7 | 7 | 21 |

=== At North Carolina A&T ===
| | 1 | 2 | 3 | 4 | Total |
|---|---|---|---|---|---|
| Spartans | 0 | 14 | 10 | 0 | 24 |
| Aggies | 7 | 21 | 7 | 14 | 49 |

=== North Carolina Central ===
| | 1 | 2 | 3 | 4 | Total |
|---|---|---|---|---|---|
| Eagles | 0 | 28 | 6 | 14 | 48 |
| Spartans | 7 | 0 | 7 | 0 | 14 |

=== At South Carolina State ===
| | 1 | 2 | 3 | 4 | Total |
|---|---|---|---|---|---|
| Spartans | 14 | 14 | 0 | 14 | 42 |
| Bulldogs | 14 | 14 | 7 | 3 | 38 |
