= 2022 South Carolina State Bulldogs football team =

American college football season

2022 South Carolina State Bulldogs football
- Conference: Mid-Eastern Athletic Conference
- Record: 3–8 (1–4 MEAC)
- Head coach: Oliver Pough (21st season)
- Offensive coordinator: Bennett Swygert (6th season)
- Defensive coordinator: Jonathan Saxon (4th as DC, 8th overall season)
- Home stadium: Oliver C. Dawson Stadium

2022 Mid-Eastern Athletic Conference football standings
	Conf.			Overall
Team	W		L	W		L
North Carolina Central +	4	–	1	10	–	2
Howard +	4	–	1	5	–	6
Delaware State	2	–	3	5	–	6
Morgan State	2	–	3	4	–	7
Norfolk State	2	–	3	2	–	9
South Carolina State	1	–	4	3	–	8
+ – Conference co-champions; Rankings from STATS Poll

The 2022 South Carolina State Bulldogs football team represented South Carolina State University as a member of the Mid-Eastern Athletic Conference (MEAC) during the 2022 NCAA Division I FCS football season. The Bulldogs, led by 21st-year head coach Oliver Pough, played their home games at Oliver C. Dawson Stadium.

== Schedule ==
Date	Time	Opponent	Site	TV	Result	Attendance
September 1	7:00 p.m.	at UCF*	FBC Mortgage Stadium; Orlando, FL	ESPN+	L 10–56	43,810
September 10	4:00 p.m.	at Bethune–Cookman*	Daytona Stadium; Daytona Beach, FL	ESPN+	W 33–9	6,071
September 24	7:00 p.m.	at North Carolina A&T*	Truist Stadium; Greensboro, NC (Rivalry)		L 27–41	14,116
September 29 (Note: The South Carolina game was moved up by two days due to Hurricane Ian.)	7:00 p.m.	at South Carolina*	Williams–Brice Stadium; Columbia, SC	SECN	L 10–50	61,551
October 8	2:00 p.m.	Florida A&M*	Oliver C. Dawson Stadium; Orangeburg, SC	ESPN+	L 14–20	13,595
October 15	1:30 p.m.	Virginia–Lynchburg*^{†}	Oliver C. Dawson Stadium; Orangeburg, SC		W 36–0	15,349
October 22	1:30 p.m.	North Carolina Central	Oliver C. Dawson Stadium; Orangeburg, SC	ESPN3	W 26–24	9,479
October 29	12:00 p.m.	at Morgan State	Hughes Stadium; Baltimore, MD		L 14–41	4,676
November 5	1:30 p.m.	Delaware State	Oliver C. Dawson Stadium; Orangeburg, SC	ESPN3	L 24–27	6,200
November 12	1:00 p.m.	at Howard	William H. Greene Stadium; Washington, D.C.		L 14–28	4,787
November 19	1:30 p.m.	Norfolk State	Oliver C. Dawson Stadium; Orangeburg, SC	ESPN+	L 38–42	5,500
*Non-conference game; ^{†}Homecoming; All times are in Eastern time

== Game summaries ==
=== At UCF ===
	1	2	3	4	Total
Bulldogs	0	3	7	0	10
Knights	21	7	14	14	56

=== At Bethune–Cookman ===
	1	2	3	4	Total
Bulldogs	7	3	10	13	33
Wildcats	0	0	3	6	9

=== At North Carolina A&T ===
	1	2	3	4	Total
Bulldogs	7	6	14	0	27
Aggies	7	10	21	3	41

=== At South Carolina ===
	1	2	3	4	Total
Bulldogs	0	0	7	3	10
Gamecocks	8	14	14	14	50

=== Florida A&M ===
	1	2	3	4	Total
Rattlers	7	10	3	0	20
Bulldogs	0	0	0	14	14

=== Virginia–Lynchburg ===
	1	2	3	4	Total
Dragons	0	0	0	0	0
Bulldogs	21	0	8	7	36

=== North Carolina Central ===
	1	2	3	4	Total
Eagles	7	7	10	0	24
Bulldogs	0	20	0	6	26

=== At Morgan State ===
	1	2	3	4	Total
Bulldogs	0	14	0	0	14
Bears	7	10	0	24	41

=== Delaware State ===
	1	2	3	4	OT	Total
Hornets	7	10	7	0	3	27
Bulldogs	0	7	7	10	0	24

=== At Howard ===
	1	2	3	4	Total
Bulldogs	7	0	0	7	14
Bison	7	14	7	0	28

=== Norfolk State ===
	1	2	3	4	Total
Spartans	14	14	0	14	42
Bulldogs	14	14	7	3	38
