= 2022 North Carolina A&T Aggies football team =

American college football season

2022 North Carolina A&T Aggies football
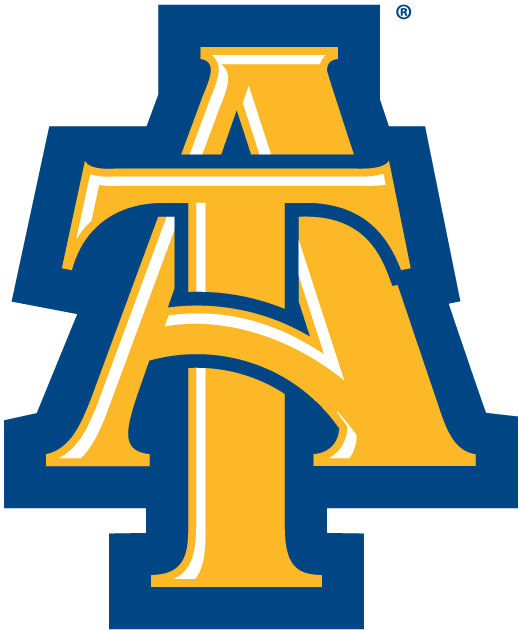
- Conference: Big South Conference
- Record: 7–4 (4–1 Big South)
- Head coach: Sam Washington (5th season)
- Offensive coordinator: Chris Barnette (5th season)
- Offensive scheme: Multiple pro-style
- Base defense: 4–2–5
- Home stadium: Truist Stadium

2022 Big South Conference football standings
	Conf.			Overall
Team	W		L	W		L
Gardner–Webb $^	5	–	0	7	–	6
North Carolina A&T	4	–	1	7	–	4
Campbell	2	–	3	5	–	6
Bryant	2	–	3	4	–	7
Charleston Southern	2	–	3	2	–	8
Robert Morris	0	–	5	0	–	11
$ – Conference champion; ^ – FCS playoff participant; Rankings from STATS Poll

The 2022 North Carolina A&T Aggies football team represented the North Carolina A&T State University during the 2022 NCAA Division I FCS football season. The Aggies played their home games at the Truist Stadium in Greensboro, North Carolina. The team was coached by fifth-year head coach Sam Washington. This was the second and final season for the Aggies in the Big South Conference.

== Schedule ==
Date	Time	Opponent	Site	TV	Result	Attendance
September 3	7:30 p.m.	vs. North Carolina Central*	Bank of America Stadium; Charlotte, NC (Duke's Mayo Classic, rivalry)	ESPN3	L 13–28	35,798
September 10	3:30 p.m.	at No. 1 North Dakota State*	Fargodome; Fargo, ND	ESPN+	L 3–43	16,269
September 17	6:00 p.m.	at Duke*	Wallace Wade Stadium; Durham, NC	ACCNX/ESPN+	L 20–49	32,802
September 24	7:00 p.m.	South Carolina State*	Truist Stadium; Greensboro, NC (rivalry)	ESPN+	W 41–27	14,116
October 1	7:00 p.m.	Bryant	Truist Stadium; Greensboro, NC	ESPN3	W 24–13	7,004
October 15	1:00 p.m.	Edward Waters*	Truist Stadium; Greensboro, NC	ESPN+	W 45–7	9,948
October 22	12:00 p.m.	at Robert Morris	Joe Walton Stadium; Moon Township, PA	ESPN+	W 38–14	2,123
October 29	1:00 p.m.	Campbell^{†}	Truist Stadium; Greensboro, NC	ESPN3	W 45–38	21,500
November 5	12:00 p.m.	Norfolk State*	Truist Stadium; Greensboro, NC	ESPN+	W 49–24	13,883
November 12	12:00 p.m.	Charleston Southern	Truist Stadium; Greensboro, NC	ESPN+	W 20–10	10,234
November 19	1:30 p.m.	at Gardner–Webb	Ernest W. Spangler Stadium; Boiling Springs, NC	ESPN+	L 17–38	268
*Non-conference game; ^{†}Homecoming; Rankings from STATS Poll released prior to the game; All times are in Eastern time

== Game summaries ==
=== vs North Carolina Central ===
	1	2	3	4	Total
Eagles	7	14	7	0	28
Aggies	7	6	0	0	13

=== At No. 1 North Dakota State ===
	1	2	3	4	Total
Aggies	3	0	0	0	3
No. 1 Bison	15	21	7	0	43

=== At Duke ===
	1	2	3	4	Total
Aggies	0	6	0	14	20
Blue Devils	21	7	14	7	49

=== South Carolina State ===
	1	2	3	4	Total
Bulldogs	7	6	14	0	27
Aggies	7	10	21	3	41

=== Bryant ===
	1	2	3	4	Total
Bulldogs	0	3	10	0	13
Aggies	14	0	3	7	24

=== Edward Waters ===
	1	2	3	4	Total
Tigers	0	0	7	0	7
Aggies	17	14	7	7	45

=== At Robert Morris ===
	1	2	3	4	Total
Aggies	13	17	3	5	38
Colonials	0	0	7	7	14

=== Campbell ===
	1	2	3	4	Total
Fighting Camels	28	0	3	7	38
Aggies	10	0	20	15	45

=== Norfolk State ===
	1	2	3	4	Total
Spartans	0	14	10	0	24
Aggies	7	21	7	14	49

=== Charleston Southern ===
	1	2	3	4	Total
Buccaneers	0	7	3	0	10
Aggies	0	7	13	0	20

=== At Gardner–Webb ===
	1	2	3	4	Total
Aggies	7	7	3	0	17
Runnin' Bulldogs	3	21	7	7	38
