= 2022 Robert Morris Colonials football team =

American college football season

2022 Robert Morris Colonials football
- Conference: Big South Conference
- Record: 0–11 (0–5 Big South)
- Head coach: Bernard Clark (5th season)
- Offensive coordinator: Eric Gallon (1st season)
- Defensive coordinator: Dave Plungas (5th season)
- Home stadium: Joe Walton Stadium

2022 Big South Conference football standings
	Conf.			Overall
Team	W		L	W		L
Gardner–Webb $^	5	–	0	7	–	6
North Carolina A&T	4	–	1	7	–	4
Campbell	2	–	3	5	–	6
Bryant	2	–	3	4	–	7
Charleston Southern	2	–	3	2	–	8
Robert Morris	0	–	5	0	–	11
$ – Conference champion; ^ – FCS playoff participant; Rankings from STATS Poll

The 2022 Robert Morris Colonials football team represented the Robert Morris University during the 2022 NCAA Division I FCS football season. Led by fifth-year head coach Bernard Clark, the Colonials played their home games at the Joe Walton Stadium in Moon Township, Pennsylvania.

== Schedule ==
Date	Time	Opponent	Site	TV	Result	Attendance
September 3	12:00 p.m.	Dayton*	Joe Walton Stadium; Moon Township, PA	ESPN+	L 20–22	3,207
September 10	6:00 p.m.	at Miami (OH)*	Yager Stadium; Oxford, OH	ESPN3	L 14–31	9,828
September 24	12:00 p.m.	East Tennessee State*	Joe Walton Stadium; Moon Township, PA	ESPN+	L 3–45	2,629
October 1	6:00 p.m.	at Delaware State*	Alumni Stadium; Dover, DE	ESPN+	L 9–14	
October 8	12:00 p.m.	Gardner–Webb^{†}	Joe Walton Stadium; Moon Township, PA	ESPN+	L 0–48	2,416
October 15	1:00 p.m.	at Campbell	Barker–Lane Stadium; Buies Creek, NC	ESPN+	L 10–41	4,903
October 22	12:00 p.m.	North Carolina A&T	Joe Walton Stadium; Moon Township, PA	ESPN3	L 14–38	2,123
October 29	3:30 p.m.	at Appalachian State*	Kidd Brewer Stadium; Boone, NC	ESPN+	L 3–42	32,501
November 5	12:00 p.m.	at Charleston Southern	Buccaneer Field; North Charleston, SC	ESPN3	L 21–34	3,033
November 12	2:00 p.m.	at Murray State*	Roy Stewart Stadium; Murray, KY	ESPN3	L 9–27	5,037
November 19	12:00 p.m.	Bryant	Joe Walton Stadium; Moon Township, PA	ESPN3	L 6–35	1,076
*Non-conference game; ^{†}Homecoming; All times are in Eastern time

== Game summaries ==
=== Dayton ===
	1	2	3	4	Total
Flyers	3	3	16	0	22
Colonials	0	14	0	6	20

=== At Miami (OH) ===
	1	2	3	4	Total
Colonials	7	0	0	7	14
RedHawks	10	14	0	7	31

=== East Tennessee State ===
	1	2	3	4	Total
Buccaneers	14	28	3	0	45
Colonials	0	0	0	3	3

=== At Delaware State ===
	1	2	3	4	Total
Colonials	3	0	0	6	9
Hornets	7	0	0	7	14

=== Gardner–Webb ===
	1	2	3	4	Total
Runnin' Bulldogs	7	13	14	14	48
Colonials	0	0	0	0	0

=== At Campbell ===
	1	2	3	4	Total
Colonials	10	0	0	0	10
Fighting Camels	7	27	0	7	41

=== North Carolina A&T ===
	1	2	3	4	Total
Aggies	13	17	3	5	38
Colonials	0	0	7	7	14

=== At Appalachian State ===
Robert Morris Colonials at Appalachian State Mountaineers – Game summary

Quarter	1	2	3	4	Total
Colonials	3	0	0	0	3
Mountaineers	14	7	14	7	42

at Kidd Brewer Stadium, Boone, North Carolina

- Date: October 29
- Game weather: Clear
- Game attendance: 32,501
- Referee: Javarro Edwards
- TV announcers (ESPN+): David Jackson, Avery Hall

Statistics

Statistics	RMU	APP
First downs	7	29
Total yards	148	512
Rushing yards	78	287
Passing yards	70	225
Turnovers	1	1
Time of possession	32:37	31:53

Team	Category	Player	Statistics
Robert Morris	Passing	Anthony Chiccitt	10/27, 70 yards, 1 INT
Robert Morris	Rushing	Alijah Jackson	11 carries, 36 yards
Robert Morris	Receiving	Demonte Martin	1 reception, 37 yards
Appalachian State	Passing	Chase Brice	17/23, 185 yards, 4 TD, 1 INT
Appalachian State	Rushing	Nate Noel	5 carries, 88 yards
Appalachian State	Receiving	Dashaun Davis	3 receptions, 57 yards, 1 TD

=== At Charleston Southern ===
	1	2	3	4	Total
Colonials	0	7	7	7	21
Buccaneers	10	10	7	7	34

=== At Murray State ===
	1	2	3	4	Total
Colonials	0	0	9	0	9
Racers	7	0	0	20	27

=== Bryant ===
	1	2	3	4	Total
Bulldogs	0	14	14	7	35
Colonials	0	0	0	6	6
