= 2022 Morgan State Bears football team =

American college football season

2022 Morgan State Bears football
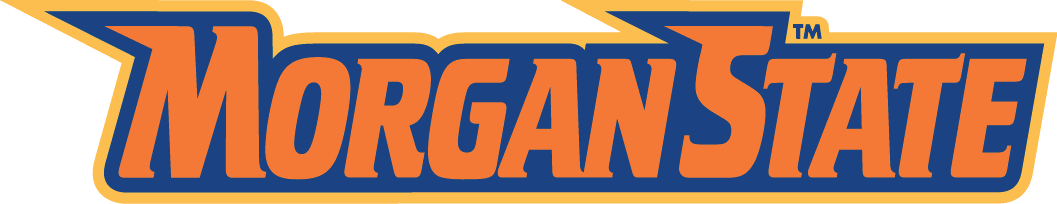
- Conference: Mid-Eastern Athletic Conference
- Record: 4–7 (2–3 MEAC)
- Head coach: Damon Wilson (1st season)
- Offensive coordinator: B. T. Sherman (1st season)
- Defensive coordinator: Antone' Sewell (1st season)
- Home stadium: Hughes Stadium

2022 Mid-Eastern Athletic Conference football standings
	Conf.			Overall
Team	W		L	W		L
North Carolina Central +	4	–	1	10	–	2
Howard +	4	–	1	5	–	6
Delaware State	2	–	3	5	–	6
Morgan State	2	–	3	4	–	7
Norfolk State	2	–	3	2	–	9
South Carolina State	1	–	4	3	–	8
+ – Conference co-champions; Rankings from STATS Poll

The 2022 Morgan State Bears football team represented Morgan State University as a member of the Mid-Eastern Athletic Conference (MEAC) during the 2022 NCAA Division I FCS football season. The Bears, led by first-year head coach Damon Wilson, played their home games at Hughes Stadium.

== Schedule ==
Date	Time	Opponent	Site	TV	Result	Attendance
September 3	6:00 p.m.	at Georgia Southern*	Paulson Stadium; Statesboro, GA	ESPN3	L 7–59	15,183
September 10	6:00 p.m.	at Towson*	Johnny Unitas Stadium; Towson, MD (The Battle for Greater Baltimore)	FloSports	L 21–29	9,784
September 17	12:00 p.m.	Sacred Heart*	Hughes Stadium; Baltimore, MD	ESPN+	W 24–9	5,347
October 1	12:00 p.m.	Virginia–Lynchburg*	Hughes Stadium; Baltimore, MD	ESPN+	W 44–10	2,576
October 8	1:00 p.m.	Norfolk State	Hughes Stadium; Baltimore, MD	ESPN+	L 21–24	10,200
October 13	7:30 p.m.	at North Carolina Central	O'Kelly–Riddick Stadium; Durham, NC	ESPN2	L 20–59	6,319
October 22	3:00 p.m.	at No. 13 Delaware*	Delaware Stadium; Newark, DE	FloSports	L 7–38	16,375
October 29	12:00 p.m.	South Carolina State	Hughes Stadium; Baltimore, MD		W 41–14	4,676
November 5	1:00 p.m.	at Stony Brook*	Kenneth P. LaValle Stadium; Stony Brook, NY	FloSports	L 22–24	4,502
November 12	2:00 p.m.	at Delaware State	Alumni Stadium; Dover, DE		W 37–7	
November 19	12:00 p.m.	Howard	Hughes Stadium; Baltimore, MD (Rivalry)	ESPN3	L 6–35	3,456
*Non-conference game; Rankings from STATS Poll released prior to the game; All times are in Eastern time

== Game summaries ==
=== At Georgia Southern ===
	1	2	3	4	Total
Bears	0	7	0	0	7
Eagles	0	17	14	28	59

=== At Towson ===
	1	2	3	4	Total
Bears	7	7	7	0	21
Tigers	3	10	13	3	29

=== Sacred Heart ===
	1	2	3	4	Total
Pioneers	0	2	0	7	9
Bears	3	7	14	0	24

=== Virginia–Lynchburg ===
	1	2	3	4	Total
Dragons	0	7	3	0	10
Hornets	23	14	0	7	44

=== Norfolk State ===
	1	2	3	4	Total
Spartans	7	10	0	7	24
Bears	0	7	0	14	21

=== At North Carolina Central ===
	1	2	3	4	Total
Bears	7	6	0	7	20
Eagles	14	28	7	10	59

=== At No. 13 Delaware ===
	1	2	3	4	Total
Bears	0	7	0	0	7
No. 13 Fightin' Blue Hens	14	0	7	17	38

=== South Carolina State ===
	1	2	3	4	Total
Bulldogs	0	14	0	0	14
Bears	7	10	0	24	41

=== At Stony Brook ===
	1	2	3	4	Total
Bears	7	3	0	12	22
Seawolves	0	7	14	3	24

=== At Delaware State ===
	1	2	3	4	Total
Bears	6	10	14	7	37
Hornets	0	7	0	0	7

=== Howard ===
	1	2	3	4	Total
Bison	7	7	7	14	35
Bears	0	0	0	6	6
