= 2005 NCAA Division II football rankings =

The 2005 NCAA Division II football rankings are from the American Football Coaches Association (AFCA). This is for the 2005 season.

== Legend ==
	Increase in ranking
	Decrease in ranking
	Not ranked previous week
(#–#)	Win–loss record
(Italics)	Number of first place votes
т	Tied with team above or below also with this symbol

== American Football Coaches Association poll ==
	Preseason	Week 1 Aug 31	Week 2 Sept 7	Week 3 Sept 14	Week 4 Sept 21	Week 5 Sept 28	Week 6 Oct 5	Week 7 Oct 12	Week 8 Oct 19	Week 9 Oct 26	Week 10 Nov 2	Week 11 Nov 9	Week 12 Postseason	
1.	Valdosta State	Valdosta State (1–0) (25)	Valdosta State (2–0)	Valdosta State (3–0) (24)	Grand Valley State (4–0) (16)	Grand Valley State (4–0) (15)	Grand Valley State (5–0) (16)	Grand Valley State (6–0) (15)	Grand Valley State (7–0) (15)	Grand Valley State (8–0) (15)	Grand Valley State (9–0) (25)	Grand Valley State (9–0) (25)	Grand Valley State (14–0) (25)	1.
2.	Pittsburg State	Grand Valley State (1–0)	Grand Valley State (2–0)	Grand Valley State (3–0) (1)	North Dakota (4–0) (5)	North Dakota (5–0) (10)	North Dakota (6–0) (9)	North Dakota (7–0) (10)	North Dakota (8–0) (10)	North Dakota (9–0) (10)	Valdosta State (9–1)	Bloomsburg (11–0)	Northwest Missouri State (11–5)	2.
3.	Grand Valley State	Texas A&M–Kingsville (1–0)	Texas A&M–Kingsville (2–0)	Texas A&M–Kingsville (3–0)	Texas A&M–Kingsville (3–0) (3)	East Stroudsburg (4–0)	Valdosta State (5–1)	Valdosta State (6–1)	Valdosta State (7–1)	Valdosta State (8–1)	Bloomsburg (10–0)	Albany State (8–1)	Saginaw Valley State (9–2)	3.
4.	Texas A&M–Kingsville	North Dakota (1–0)	North Dakota (2–0)	North Dakota (3–0)	Nebraska–Omaha (3–0)	Pittsburg State (4–1)	Saginaw Valley State (5–0)	Saginaw Valley State (6–0)	Bloomsburg (8–0)	Bloomsburg (9–0)	Albany State (7–1)	Saginaw Valley State (9–1)	North Alabama (11–3)	4.
5.	Northwest Missouri State	Northwest Missouri State (1–0)	Nebraska–Omaha (2–0)	Nebraska–Omaha (3–0)	Carson–Newman (3–0) (1)	Valdosta State (4–1)	South Dakota (6–0)	South Dakota (7–0)	Albany State (5–1)	Albany State (6–1)	Washburn (9–1)	Presbyterian (10–1)	East Stroudsburg (11–3)	5.
6.	North Dakota	Carson–Newman (1–0)	Carson–Newman (2–0)	Carson–Newman (2–0)	East Stroudsburg (3–0)	Saginaw Valley State (4–0)	Northwest Missouri State (5–1)	Texas A&M–Kingsville (5–1)	East Stroudsburg (6–1)	Washburn (8–1)	Saginaw Valley State (8–1)	Shepherd (11–0)	Central Arkansas (11–3)	6.
7.	Carson–Newman	Nebraska–Omaha (1–0)	East Stroudsburg (2–0)	East Stroudsburg (3–0)	Pittsburg State (3–1)	Northwest Missouri State (4–1)	Arkansas Tech (5–0)	Bloomsburg (7–0)	West Texas A&M (8–0)	Saginaw Valley State (7–1)	North Dakota (9–1)	West Texas A&M (10–1)	Bloomsburg (11–1)	7.
8.	Nebraska–Omaha	East Stroudsburg (1–0)	Pittsburg State (1–1)	Pittsburg State (2–1)	Valdosta State (3–1)	South Dakota (5–0)	Texas A&M–Kingsville (4–1)	Albany State (4–1)	St. Cloud State (7–1)	South Dakota (8–1)	Shepherd (10–0)	Tuskegee (9–1)	North Dakota (10–3)	8.
9.	East Stroudsburg	Delta State (1–0)	Delta State (1–1)	Delta State (2–1)	Saginaw Valley State (3–0)	Tuskegee (4–0)	Michigan Tech (5–0)	East Stroudsburg (5–1)	Northwood (7–1)	Arkansas Tech (7–1)	Presbyterian (9–1)	Valdosta State (9–2)	Albany State (8–2)	9.
10.	Northwood	Albany State (1–0)	Northwest Missouri State (1–1)	Northwest Missouri State (2–1)	Northwest Missouri State (3–1)	Arkansas Tech (4–0)	Bloomsburg (6–0)	West Texas A&M (7–0)	Washburn (7–1)	Shepherd (9–0)	Tuskegee (8–1)	Northwood (9–2)	Presbyterian (10–2)	10.
11.	Albany State	Pittsburg State (1–0)	Tuskegee (1–0)	Saginaw Valley State (2–0)	Tuskegee (3–0)	St. Cloud State (5–0)	Carson–Newman (4–1)	Northwood (6–1)	Saginaw Valley State (6–1)	Presbyterian (8–1)	Pittsburg State (8–2)	South Dakota (9–2)	Tuskegee (11–1)	11.
12.	Central Oklahoma	Edinboro (1–0)	Saginaw Valley State (1–0)	Tuskegee (2–0)	Arkansas Tech (3–0)	Texas A&M–Kingsville (3–1)	Albany State (4–1)	St. Cloud State (6–1)	South Dakota (7–1)	Tuskegee (7–1)	West Texas A&M (9–1)	Washburn (9–2)	Pittsburg State (10–4)	12.
13.	Winona State	Tuskegee (1–0)	Catawba (2–0)	Catawba (3–0)	St. Cloud State (4–0)	Michigan Tech (4–0)	Nebraska–Omaha (4–1)	Washburn (6–1)	Arkansas Tech (6–1)	West Texas A&M (8–1)	Northwood (8–2)	North Alabama (8–2)	Washburn (9–3)	13.
14.	Colorado Mines	Saginaw Valley State (1–0)	Arkansas Tech (1–0)	Arkansas Tech (2–0)	South Dakota (4–0)	North Alabama (4–0)	East Stroudsburg (4–1)	Arkansas Tech (5–1)	North Alabama (6–1)	Pittsburg State (7–2)	St. Cloud State (8–2)	Nebraska–Omaha (8–2)	Valdosta State (9–3)	14.
15.	Edinboro	Arkansas Tech (1–0) т	St. Cloud State (2–0)	St. Cloud State (3–0)	Michigan Tech (3–0)	Carson–Newman (3–1)	Northwood (5–1)	Tuskegee (5–1)	Shepherd (8–0)	Northwood (7–2)	North Alabama (7–2)	Central Arkansas (9–2)	West Texas A&M (10–2)	15.
16.	Tuskegee	West Chester (1–0) т	South Dakota (2–0)	South Dakota (3–0)	Albany State (3–1)	Nebraska–Omaha (3–1)	West Texas A&M (6–0)	Shepherd (7–0)	Presbyterian (7–1)	Northwest Missouri State (6–2)	South Dakota (8–2)	North Dakota (9–2)	Nebraska–Omaha (8–3)	16.
17.	Delta State	Catawba (1–0)	Albany State (1–1)	Michigan Tech (3–0)	Tarleton State (3–0)	Albany State (3–1)	Edinboro (4–1)	Presbyterian (6–1) т	Tuskegee (6–1)	St. Cloud State (7–2)	Nebraska–Omaha (7–2)	East Stroudsburg (8–2)	South Dakota (9–2)	17.
18.	Arkansas Tech	St. Cloud State (1–0)	Michigan Tech (2–0)	Albany State (2–1)	North Alabama (3–0)	Tarleton State (4–0)	St. Cloud State (5–1)	North Alabama (5–1) т	Pittsburg State (6–2)	North Alabama (6–2)	East Stroudsburg (7–2)	Carson–Newman (8–2)	Northwood (9–3)	18.
19.	West Chester	Michigan Tech (1–0)	Edinboro (1–1)	Tarleton State (2–0)	Northwood (3–1)	Northwood (4–1)	Tuskegee (4–1)	Michigan Tech (5–1)	Tarleton State (6–1)	Angelo State (8–1)	Central Arkansas (8–2)	North Carolina Central (10–1)	North Carolina Central (10–2)	19.
20.	Catawba	South Dakota (1–0)	Tarleton State (1–0)	Edinboro (1–1)	Edinboro (2–1)	Bloomsburg (5–0)	Pittsburg State (4–2)	Pittsburg State (5–2)	Northwest Missouri State (5–2)	East Stroudsburg (6–2)	Arkansas Tech (7–2)	Angelo State (9–2)	Shepherd (11–1)	20.
21.	Saginaw Valley State	Northwood (0–1)	Northwood (1–1)	Northwood (2–1)	Bloomsburg (4–0)	Edinboro (3–1)	Shepherd (6–0)	Northwest Missouri State (5–2)	St. Augustine's (8–0) т	Texas A&M–Kingsville (6–2)	Carson–Newman (7–2)	Northwest Missouri State (7–3)	Carson–Newman (8–2)	21.
22.	St. Cloud State	Tarleton State (0–0)	C.W. Post (1–0)	Bloomsburg (3–0)	Catawba (3–1)	West Texas A&M (5–0)	North Alabama (4–1)	Tarleton State (5–1)	Texas A&M–Kingsville (5–2) т	Central Arkansas (7–2)	Tarleton State (7–2)	Edinboro (8–2)	C.W. Post (10–3)	22.
23.	Tarleton State	C.W. Post (0–0)	Missouri Western State (2–0)	West Chester (2–1)	Delta State (2–2)	Shepherd (5–0)	Presbyterian (5–1)	Carson–Newman (4–2)	Central Arkansas (6–2)	West Chester (7–2)	North Carolina Central (9–1)	Pittsburg State (8–3)	Angelo State (9–3)	23.
24.	Michigan Tech	Central Arkansas (1–0)	Central Oklahoma (1–1)	Washburn (3–0)	Harding (3–1)	Delta State (3–2)	Tarleton State (4–1)	St. Augustine's (7–0)	Carson–Newman (5–2)	Carson–Newman (6–2)	Angelo State (8–2)	Nebraska–Kearney (9–2)	Nebraska–Kearney (9–3)	24.
25.	South Dakota т	Central Oklahoma (0–1)	West Chester (1–1)	Presbyterian (3–0)	Shepherd (4–0)	Presbyterian (4–1)	Washburn (5–1)	Central Arkansas (5–2)	Michigan Tech (5–2)	Nebraska–Omaha (6–2)	Northwest Missouri State (6–3)	St. Cloud State (8–3)	Missouri Western State (9–3)	25.
26.	C.W. Post т													26.
	Preseason	Week 1 Aug 31	Week 2 Sept 7	Week 3 Sept 14	Week 4 Sept 21	Week 5 Sept 28	Week 6 Oct 5	Week 7 Oct 12	Week 8 Oct 19	Week 9 Oct 26	Week 10 Nov 2	Week 11 Nov 9	Week 12 Postseason	
		Dropped: 13 Winona State; 14 Colorado Mines	Dropped: 24 Central Arkansas	Dropped: 22 C.W. Post; 23 Missouri Western State; 24 Central Oklahoma	Dropped: 23 West Chester; 24 Washburn; 25 Presbyterian	Dropped: 22 Catawba; 24 Harding	Dropped: 24 Delta State	Dropped: 13 Nebraska–Omaha; 17 Edinboro	None	Dropped: 19 Tarleton State; 21 St. Augustine's; 25 Michigan Tech	Dropped: 21 Texas A&M–Kingsville; 23 West Chester	Dropped: 20 Arkansas Tech; 22 Tarleton State	Dropped: 22 Edinboro; 25 St. Cloud State	
