= 2005 Humboldt State Lumberjacks football team =

American college football season

2005 Humboldt State Lumberjacks football
- Conference: Great Northwest Athletic Conference
- Record: 5–6 (1–5 GNAC)
- Head coach: Doug Adkins (6th season)
- Home stadium: Redwood Bowl

2005 Great Northwest Athletic Conference football standings
	Conf.			Overall
Team	W		L	W		L
Central Washington $	6	–	0	8	–	2
Western Washington	3	–	3	4	–	6
Western Oregon	2	–	4	5	–	6
Humboldt State	1	–	5	5	–	6
$ – Conference champion

The 2005 Humboldt State Lumberjacks football team represented Humboldt State University—now known as California State Polytechnic University, Humboldt—as a member of the Great Northwest Athletic Conference (GNAC) during the 2005 NCAA Division II football season. Led sixth-year head coach Doug Adkins, the Lumberjacks compiled an overall record of 5–6 with a mark of 1–5 in conference play, placing last out of four teams in the GNAC. The team outscored its opponents 251 to 212 for the season. Humboldt State played home games at the Redwood Bowl in Arcata, California.

== Schedule ==
Date	Opponent	Site	Result
September 3	Mesa State*	Redwood Bowl; Arcata, CA	W 28–9
September 10	at Menlo*	Connor Field; Atherton, CA	W 60–14
September 17	at Southern Oregon*	Fuller Field; Ashland, OR	W 19–14
September 24	Azusa Pacific*	Redwood Bowl; Arcata, CA	L 12–13
October 1	at Western Washington	Civic Stadium; Bellingham, WA	L 16–21
October 8	Western Oregon	Redwood Bowl; Arcata, CA	W 17–9
October 15	at Central Washington	Tomlinson Stadium; Ellensburg, WA	L 7–30
October 22	Western Washington	Redwood Bowl; Arcata, CA	L 24–28
October 29	at Western Oregon	McArthur Field; Monmouth, OR	L 35–39
November 5	Central Washington	Redwood Bowl; Arcata, CA	L 14–28
November 12	Southern Oregon*	Redwood Bowl; Arcata, CA	W 19–7
*Non-conference game
