= 2022 Gardner–Webb Runnin' Bulldogs football team =

American college football season

2022 Gardner–Webb Runnin' Bulldogs football
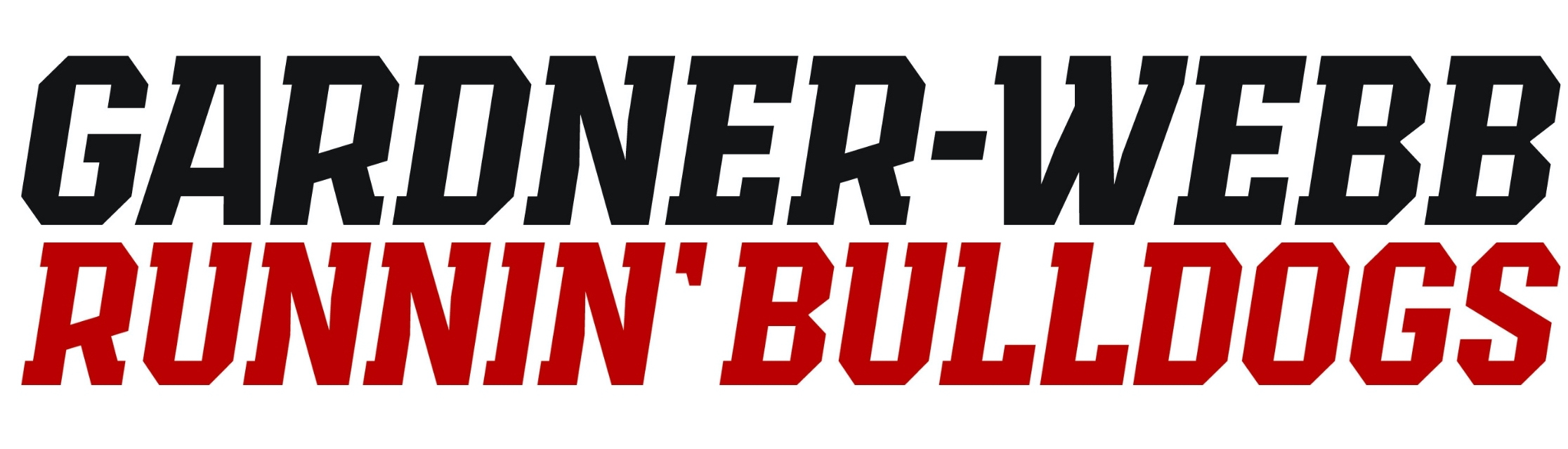

Big South champion

NCAA Division I Second Round, L 14–54 at William & Mary
- Conference: Big South Conference
- Record: 7–6 (5–0 Big South)
- Head coach: Tre Lamb (3rd season)
- Defensive coordinator: Josh Reardon (3rd season)
- Home stadium: Ernest W. Spangler Stadium

2022 Big South Conference football standings
	Conf.			Overall
Team	W		L	W		L
Gardner–Webb $^	5	–	0	7	–	6
North Carolina A&T	4	–	1	7	–	4
Campbell	2	–	3	5	–	6
Bryant	2	–	3	4	–	7
Charleston Southern	2	–	3	2	–	8
Robert Morris	0	–	5	0	–	11
$ – Conference champion; ^ – FCS playoff participant; Rankings from STATS Poll

The 2022 Gardner–Webb Runnin' Bulldogs football team represented Gardner–Webb University as a member of the Big South Conference during the 2022 NCAA Division I FCS football season. Led by third-year head coach Tre Lamb, the Runnin' Bulldogs played their home games at the Ernest W. Spangler Stadium in Boiling Springs, North Carolina.

Three milestones were reached for the program this season. For the first time since 2003, Gardner-Webb won the Big South championship. With it, they clinched an automatic bid to the NCAA Division I Football Championship, their first playoff appearance as an FCS team and first as a program since the 1992 NAIA playoffs. Their best season in 19 years would be further added on with a win over Eastern Kentucky in the first round of the playoffs, their first FCS playoff win in program history. They would ultimately fall to William & Mary in the second round.

== Schedule ==
Date	Time	Opponent	Site	TV	Result	Attendance
September 1	7:00 p.m.	Limestone*	Ernest W. Spangler Stadium; Boiling Springs, NC	ESPN+	W 56–21	4,560
September 10	6:00 p.m.	at Coastal Carolina*	Brooks Stadium; Conway, SC	ESPN+	L 27–31	12,261
September 17	6:00 p.m.	at Elon*	Rhodes Stadium; Elon, NC	FloSports	L 24–30	8,126
September 24	6:00 p.m.	No. 17 Mercer*	Ernest W. Spangler Stadium; Boiling Springs, NC	ESPN+	L 14–45	4,750
October 1	3:30 p.m.	at Marshall*	Joan C. Edwards Stadium; Huntington, WV	ESPN+	L 7–28	19,845
October 8	12:00 p.m.	at Robert Morris	Joe Walton Stadium; Moon Township, PA	ESPN3	W 48–0	2,416
October 15	3:30 p.m.	at Liberty*	Williams Stadium; Lynchburg, VA	ESPN+	L 20–21	20,924
October 22	6:00 p.m.	at Charleston Southern	Buccaneer Field; North Charleston, SC	ESPN3	W 28–14	4,112
October 29	1:30 p.m.	Bryant^{†}	Ernest W. Spangler Stadium; Boiling Springs, NC	ESPN+	W 48–40	3,060
November 12	1:00 p.m.	at Campbell	Barker–Lane Stadium; Buies Creek, NC	ESPN3	W 42–35	4,586
November 19	1:30 p.m.	North Carolina A&T	Ernest W. Spangler Stadium; Boiling Springs, NC	ESPN+	W 38–17	268
November 26	5:00 p.m.	at Eastern Kentucky*	Roy Kidd Stadium; Richmond, KY (NCAA Division I First Round)	ESPN+	W 52–41	4,973
December 3	2:00 p.m.	at No. 6 William & Mary*	Zable Stadium; Williamsburg, VA (NCAA Division I Second Round)	ESPN+	L 14–54	7,110
*Non-conference game; ^{†}Homecoming; Rankings from STATS Poll released prior to the game; All times are in Eastern time

== Game summaries ==
=== Limestone ===
	1	2	3	4	Total
Saints	0	7	7	7	21
Runnin' Bulldogs	28	14	14	0	56

=== At Coastal Carolina ===
	1	2	3	4	Total
Runnin' Bulldogs	0	10	10	7	27
Chanticleers	3	14	7	7	31

=== At Elon ===
	1	2	3	4	Total
Runnin' Bulldogs	3	21	0	0	24
Phoenix	13	7	7	3	30

=== No. 17 Mercer ===
	1	2	3	4	Total
No. 17 Bears	21	7	7	10	45
Runnin' Bulldogs	0	7	7	0	14

=== At Marshall ===
Game Five – Gardner–Webb Runnin' Bulldogs (1–3) at Marshall Thundering Herd (2–2)

Quarter	1	2	3	4	Total
Runnin' Bulldogs	7	0	0	0	7
Thundering Herd	7	7	7	7	28

at Joan C. Edwards Stadium • Huntington, West Virginia

- Date: Saturday, October 1, 2022
- Game time: 3:30 p.m. EDT
- Game weather: Rain • Temperature: 54 °F (12 °C) • Wind: N/A
- Game attendance: 19,845
- Referee: Scott Jackson
- TV announcers (ESPN+): Chad Bush (play-by-play), Doug Chapman (analyst)

Game information

First quarter

- (9:30) MRSH – A.J. Turner 24 yard pass from Henry Colombi, Rece Verhoff kick (Drive: 7 plays, 41 yards, 2:40; Marshall 7–0)
- (3:03) GWU – Ty Anderson 45 yard interception return, Jay Billingsly kick (Tied 7–7)

Second quarter

- (5:48) MRSH – Corey Gammage 10 yard pass from Henry Colombi, Rece Verhoff kick (Drive: 6 plays, 57 yards, 2:59; Marshall 14–7)

Third quarter

- (11:09) MRSH – Khalan Laborn 1 yard run, Rece Verhoff kick (Drive: 10 plays, 67 yards, 3:13; Marshall 21–7)

Fourth quarter

- (8:11) MRSH – Khalan Laborn 78 yard run, Rece Verhoff kick (Drive: 1 play, 78 yards, 0:12; Marshall 28-7)

Statistics	GWU	MRSH
First downs	8	21
Plays–yards	51–143	86–421
Rushes–yards	19–19	53–236
Passing yards	124	185
Passing: comp–att–int	11–32–3	21–33–1
Time of possession	21:34	38:26

Team	Category	Player	Statistics
Gardner–Webb	Passing	Bailey Fisher	9/28, 114 yards, 3 INT
Gardner–Webb	Rushing	Donovan Jones	4 carries, 37 yards
Gardner–Webb	Receiving	Deland Thomas	2 receptions, 49 yards
Marshall	Passing	Henry Colombi	13/20, 138 yards, 2 TD, 1 INT
Marshall	Rushing	Khalan Laborn	35 carries, 191 yards, 2 TD
Marshall	Receiving	Charles Montgomery	5 receptions, 72 yards

=== At Robert Morris ===
	1	2	3	4	Total
Runnin' Bulldogs	7	13	14	14	48
Colonials	0	0	0	0	0

=== At Liberty ===
	1	2	3	4	Total
Runnin' Bulldogs	0	10	7	3	20
Flames	7	7	0	7	21

=== At Charleston Southern ===
	1	2	3	4	Total
Runnin’ Bulldogs	3	10	15	0	28
Buccaneers	7	0	7	0	14

=== Bryant ===
	1	2	3	4	Total
Bulldogs	14	9	6	11	40
Runnin' Bulldogs	14	14	14	6	48

=== At Campbell ===
	1	2	3	4	Total
Runnin' Bulldogs	14	21	7	0	42
Fighting Camels	0	14	14	7	35

=== North Carolina A&T ===
	1	2	3	4	Total
Aggies	7	7	3	0	17
Runnin' Bulldogs	3	21	7	7	38

== FCS Playoffs ==
=== At Eastern Kentucky – first round ===
	1	2	3	4	Total
Runnin' Bulldogs	21	10	21	0	52
Colonels	14	13	0	14	41

=== At No. 6 William & Mary – second round ===
	1	2	3	4	Total
Runnin' Bulldogs	0	0	7	7	14
No. 6 Tribe	7	27	13	7	54
