= 2005 NCAA Division II football season =

American college football season

- The 2005 season's championship logo
- Regular season: August 27 – November 5, 2005
- Playoffs: November 12 – December 10, 2005
- National Championship: Braly Municipal Stadium; Florence, AL
- Champion: Grand Valley State
- Harlon Hill Trophy: Jimmy Terwilliger, East Stroudsburg

The 2005 NCAA Division II football season, part of college football in the United States organized by the National Collegiate Athletic Association at the Division II level, began on August 27, 2005, and concluded with the NCAA Division II Football Championship on December 10, 2005, at Braly Municipal Stadium in Florence, Alabama, hosted by the University of North Alabama. The Grand Valley State Lakers defeated the Northwest Missouri State Bearcats, 21–17, to win their third Division II national title.

The Harlon Hill Trophy was awarded to Jimmy Terwilliger, quarterback from East Stroudsburg.

== Conference changes and new programs ==
School	Former conference	New conference
Central State Marauders	New program	Independent
Charleston Golden Eagles	Independent	WVIAC
Missouri–Rolla Miners	MIAA	Independent
Saint Paul's Tigers	New program	CIAA
Stillman Tigers	Independent	SIAC

Stillman completed their transition to Division II and became eligible for the postseason.

== Conference standings ==
=== Northeast Region ===
2005 Northeast-10 Conference football standings
	Conf.			Overall
Team	W		L	W		L
No. 22 C. W. Post $^	8	–	1	10	–	3
Southern Connecticut ^	7	–	2	8	–	3
Bentley	7	–	2	7	–	3
Bryant	6	–	3	7	–	3
American International	5	–	4	5	–	4
Stonehill	4	–	5	4	–	6
Assumption	3	–	6	4	–	6
Merrimack	3	–	6	4	–	6
Pace	2	–	7	3	–	7
Saint Anselm	0	–	9	1	–	9
$ – Conference champion; ^ – NCAA Division II playoff participant; Rankings from AFCA poll

2005 Pennsylvania State Athletic Conference football standings
	Conf.			Overall
Team	W		L	W		L
East
No. 7 Bloomsburg x^	6	–	0	11	–	1
West Chester ^	5	–	1	8	–	4
No. 5 East Stroudsburg ^	4	–	2	11	–	3
Millersville	3	–	3	5	–	6
Kutztown	2	–	4	2	–	8
Cheyney	1	–	5	1	–	10
Mansfield	1	–	5	1	–	10
West
California (PA) x	5	–	1	8	–	2
Edinboro x	5	–	1	8	–	2
IUP	4	–	2	5	–	5
Slippery Rock	4	–	2	5	–	5
Shippensburg	2	–	4	4	–	7
Clarion	1	–	5	3	–	7
Lock Haven	0	–	6	2	–	9
x – Division champion/co-champions; ^ – NCAA Division II playoff participant; Rankings from AFCA poll

2005 West Virginia Intercollegiate Athletic Conference football standings
	Conf.			Overall
Team	W		L	W		L
No. 20 Shepherd $^	8	–	0	11	–	1
Glenville State	7	–	1	9	–	2
Charleston (WV)	6	–	2	8	–	3
West Liberty	4	–	4	6	–	5
Fairmont State	4	–	4	4	–	6
Concord	3	–	5	4	–	7
West Virginia Wesleyan	2	–	6	3	–	8
West Virginia State	2	–	6	2	–	9
West Virginia Tech	0	–	8	0	–	11
$ – Conference champion; ^ – NCAA Division II playoff participant; Rankings from AFCA poll

=== Southeast Region ===
2005 Central Intercollegiate Athletic Association football standings
	Conf.			Overall
Team	W		L	W		L
Eastern
Bowie State # xy	5	–	2	8	–	4
Virginia State x	5	–	2	6	–	4
Shaw	4	–	3	5	–	5
Saint Paul's	3	–	4	4	–	6
Virginia Union	2	–	5	3	–	7
Elizabeth City State	1	–	6	2	–	8
Western
No. 19 North Carolina Central xy$^	6	–	1	10	–	2
Winston-Salem State x	6	–	1	6	–	4
Fayetteville State	4	–	3	6	–	4
Livingstone	1	–	6	1	–	9
Johnson C. Smith	0	–	7	0	–	10
St. Augustine's *	0	–	2	0	–	2
Championship: North Carolina Central 26, Bowie State 23
$ – Conference champion; x – Division champion/co-champions; y – Championship game participant; ^ – NCAA Division II playoff participant; # – Pioneer Bowl participant * – St. Augustine's vacated 8 wins including 5 in conference play; Rankings from AFCA poll

2005 Gulf South Conference football standings
	Conf.			Overall
Team	W		L	W		L
No. 6 Central Arkansas $^	8	–	1	11	–	3
No. 4 North Alabama ^	7	–	2	11	–	3
No. 14 Valdosta State ^	7	–	2	9	–	3
West Georgia	7	–	2	7	–	4
Delta State	6	–	3	7	–	4
Arkansas Tech	6	–	3	7	–	3
Harding	4	–	5	6	–	5
Southern Arkansas	4	–	5	6	–	5
Henderson State	2	–	7	3	–	8
Ouachita Baptist	2	–	7	2	–	8
Arkansas–Monticello	1	–	8	1	–	10
West Alabama	0	–	9	2	–	9
$ – Conference champion; ^ – NCAA Division II playoff participant; Rankings from AFCA poll

2005 South Atlantic Conference football standings
	Conf.			Overall
Team	W		L	W		L
No. 10 Presbyterian $^	7	–	0	10	–	2
Carson–Newman	5	–	2	8	–	2
Newberry	4	–	3	5	–	4
Catawba	3	–	4	6	–	5
Lenoir–Rhyne	3	–	4	5	–	5
Mars Hill	3	–	4	4	–	6
Wingate	2	–	5	5	–	5
Tusculum	1	–	6	3	–	7
$ – Conference champion; ^ – NCAA Division II playoff participant; Rankings from AFCA poll

2005 Southern Intercollegiate Athletic Conference football standings
	Conf.			Overall
Team	W		L	W		L
No. 11 Tuskegee # +	8	–	1	11	–	1
No. 9 Albany State +^	8	–	1	8	–	2
Fort Valley State	7	–	2	7	–	3
Stillman	5	–	4	6	–	4
Kentucky State	5	–	4	6	–	5
Benedict	4	–	5	6	–	5
Miles	3	–	6	4	–	7
Clark Atlanta	3	–	6	3	–	8
Morehouse	2	–	7	3	–	7
Lane	0	–	9	0	–	10
+ – Conference co-champions; ^ – NCAA Division II playoff participant; # – Pioneer Bowl participant; Rankings from AFCA Poll

2005 NCAA Division II Southeast Region independents football records
	Conf.			Overall
Team	W		L	W		L
North Greenville		–		2	–	8
Rankings from AFCA Poll

=== Northwest Region ===
2005 Great Lakes Intercollegiate Athletic Conference football standings
	Conf.			Overall
Team	W		L	W		L
No. 1 Grand Valley State $^	9	–	0	13	–	0
No. 3 Saginaw Valley State * ^	9	–	1	11	–	2
No. 18 Northwood ^	8	–	2	9	–	3
Ashland	8	–	2	9	–	2
Michigan Tech	6	–	3	6	–	3
Indianapolis	5	–	5	6	–	5
Hillsdale	4	–	6	5	–	6
Wayne State (MI)	3	–	7	3	–	7
Ferris State	3	–	7	3	–	8
Gannon	3	–	7	3	–	8
Findlay	2	–	8	3	–	8
Mercyhurst	2	–	8	2	–	8
Northern Michigan	2	–	8	2	–	8
$ – Conference champion; ^ – NCAA Division II playoff participant; * – Saginaw Valley State forfeited all wins, giving all other GLIAC teams except Grand Valley State, Ashland, and Gannon one more official win than shown.; Rankings from AFCA poll

2005 Great Northwest Athletic Conference football standings
	Conf.			Overall
Team	W		L	W		L
Central Washington $	6	–	0	8	–	2
Western Washington	3	–	3	4	–	6
Western Oregon	2	–	4	5	–	6
Humboldt State	1	–	5	5	–	6
$ – Conference champion

2005 North Central Conference football standings
	Conf.			Overall
Team	W		L	W		L
No. 17 South Dakota +	4	–	2	9	–	2
No. 8 North Dakota +^	4	–	2	10	–	3
No. 16 Nebraska–Omaha +^	4	–	2	8	–	3
Minnesota–Duluth +^	4	–	2	8	–	4
St. Cloud State	3	–	3	8	–	3
Augustana (SD)	2	–	4	6	–	5
Minnesota State	0	–	6	2	–	9
+ – Conference co-champions; ^ – NCAA Division II playoff participant; Rankings from AFCA Poll

2005 Northern Sun Intercollegiate Conference football standings
	Conf.			Overall
Team	W		L	W		L
Concordia–St. Paul # +	6	–	1	9	–	3
Winona State +	6	–	1	8	–	3
Northern State	5	–	2	6	–	5
Bemidji State	4	–	3	7	–	3
Wayne State (NE)	4	–	3	4	–	7
SW Minnesota State	1	–	6	4	–	7
Minnesota State–Moorhead	1	–	6	1	–	9
Minnesota–Crookston	1	–	6	1	–	10
+ – Conference co-champions; # – Mineral Water Bowl participant

2005 NCAA Division II Northwest Region independents football records
	Conf.			Overall
Team	W		L	W		L
Saint Joseph's (IN)		–		7	–	4
Tiffin		–		6	–	5
Upper Iowa #		–		3	–	8
Central State #		–		1	–	5
# – Provisional Division II member; Rankings from AFCA Poll

=== Southwest Region ===
2005 Lone Star Conference football standings
	Conf.			Overall
Team	W		L	W		L
North Division
SE Oklahoma State	7	–	2	8	–	2
Texas A&M–Commerce	5	–	4	5	–	5
Central Oklahoma	3	–	6	3	–	7
East Central	2	–	7	3	–	7
Northeastern State	2	–	7	2	–	8
SW Oklahoma State	0	–	9	1	–	10
South Division
No. 15 West Texas A&M $^	8	–	1	10	–	2
No. 23 Angelo State ^	7	–	2	9	–	3
Tarleton State	6	–	3	7	–	3
Midwestern State	5	–	4	6	–	4
Texas A&M–Kingsville	5	–	4	6	–	4
Eastern New Mexico	4	–	5	5	–	6
Abilene Christian	4	–	5	4	–	6
$ – Conference champion; ^ – NCAA Division II playoff participant; Rankings from AFCA Poll

2005 Mid-America Intercollegiate Athletics Association football standings
	Conf.			Overall
Team	W		L	W		L
No. 13 Washburn $^	7	–	1	9	–	3
No. 25 Missouri Western #	6	–	2	9	–	3
No. 2 NW Missouri State ^	6	–	2	11	–	4
No. 12 Pittsburg State ^	6	–	2	10	–	4
Central Missouri State	5	–	3	7	–	3
Emporia State	3	–	5	4	–	6
Missouri Southern	2	–	6	3	–	7
Southwest Baptist	2	–	7	3	–	8
Truman	0	–	8	2	–	9
$ – Conference champion; ^ – NCAA Division II playoff participant; # – Mineral Water Bowl participant; Rankings from AFCA poll

2005 Rocky Mountain Athletic Conference football standings
	Conf.			Overall
Team	W		L	W		L
No. 24 Nebraska–Kearney $^	7	–	1	9	–	3
Fort Lewis	6	–	2	6	–	4
Colorado Mines	6	–	2	6	–	5
Adams State	5	–	3	6	–	5
Mesa State	4	–	4	5	–	6
Chadron State	4	–	4	4	–	6
Fort Hays State	2	–	6	2	–	8
Western State	2	–	6	2	–	9
New Mexico Highlands	0	–	8	0	–	10
$ – Conference champion; ^ – NCAA Division II playoff participant; Rankings from AFCA Poll

2005 NCAA Division II Southwest Region independents football records
	Conf.			Overall
Team	W		L	W		L
Missouri–Rolla		–		7	–	4
Western New Mexico		–		5	–	5
Lincoln (MO)		–		2	–	7
OK Panhandle State		–		1	–	10
Rankings from AFCA Poll

== Conference summaries ==
Conference Champions

Central Intercollegiate Athletic Association – North Carolina Central
Great Lakes Intercollegiate Athletic Conference – Grand Valley State
Great Northwest Athletic Conference – Central Washington
Gulf South Conference – Central Arkansas
Lone Star Conference – West Texas A&M
Mid-America Intercollegiate Athletics Association – Washburn
North Central Conference – Minnesota–Duluth, Nebraska–Omaha, North Dakota, and South Dakota
Northeast-10 Conference – C.W. Post
Northern Sun Intercollegiate Conference – Concordia–Saint Paul and Winona State
Pennsylvania State Athletic Conference – Bloomsburg (East), California (PA) and Edinboro (West)
Rocky Mountain Athletic Conference – Nebraska–Kearney
South Atlantic Conference – Presbyterian
Southern Intercollegiate Athletic Conference – Albany State
West Virginia Intercollegiate Athletic Conference – Shepherd

== Postseason ==
2005 NCAA Division II Football Championship
- Teams: 24
- Finals Site: Braly Municipal Stadium; Florence, AL
- Champion: Grand Valley State; (3rd title, title game)
- Runner-up: Northwest Missouri State; (3rd title game)
- Semifinalists: East Stroudsburg; North Alabama
- Winning coach: championship

The 2005 NCAA Division II Football Championship playoffs were the 32nd single-elimination tournament to determine the national champion of men's NCAA Division II college football. The championship game was held at Braly Municipal Stadium in Florence, Alabama for the 18th time.

=== Seeded teams ===
- Bloomsburg
- Grand Valley State
- Nebraska–Omaha
- North Carolina Central
- Presbyterian
- Shepherd
- Washburn
- West Texas A&M

=== Playoff bracket ===
First round November 12; Campus Sites	Second round November 19; Campus Sites
1	Presbyterian*	28
5	Central Arkansas	52
5	Central Arkansas	28
4	Albany State	20
Super Region 2
2	North Carolina Central*	21
6	North Alabama	24
6	North Alabama	40
3	Valdosta State	13
1	West Texas A&M*	3
5	Pittsburg State	41
5	Pittsburg State	49
4	Nebraska–Kearney	20
Super Region 4
2	Washburn*	32
6	NW Missouri State	42
6	NW Missouri State	45
3	Angelo State	14
1	Shepherd*	21
4	C.W. Post	28
4	C.W. Post	24
5	West Chester	20
Super Region 1
2	Bloomsburg*	39
3	East Stroudsburg	52
3	East Stroudsburg	55
6	S. Connecticut	33
1	Grand Valley State*	17
4	North Dakota	3
4	North Dakota	23
5	Minnesota–Duluth	12
Super Region 3
2	Nebraska–Omaha*	21
3	Saginaw Valley	24
3	Saginaw Valley State	31
6	Northwood	16

Quarterfinals; November 26; Campus Sites
5	Central Arkansas	38
6	North Alabama	41
5	Pittsburg State	10
6	NW Missouri State	21
4	C.W. Post	28
3	East Stroudsburg	55
1	Grand Valley State	24
3	Saginaw Valley	17

Semifinals; December 3 Campus Sites
6	North Alabama	24
6	NW Missouri State	25
3	East Stroudsburg	20
1	Grand Valley State	55

National Championship Game; December 10; Braly Municipal Stadium, Florence, Alabama
6	NW Missouri State	17
1	Grand Valley State	21

* Home team † Overtime

== See also ==
- 2005 NCAA Division I-A football season
- 2005 NCAA Division I-AA football season
- 2005 NCAA Division III football season
- 2005 NAIA football season
