= Don Carthel =

American football player and coach (born 1952)

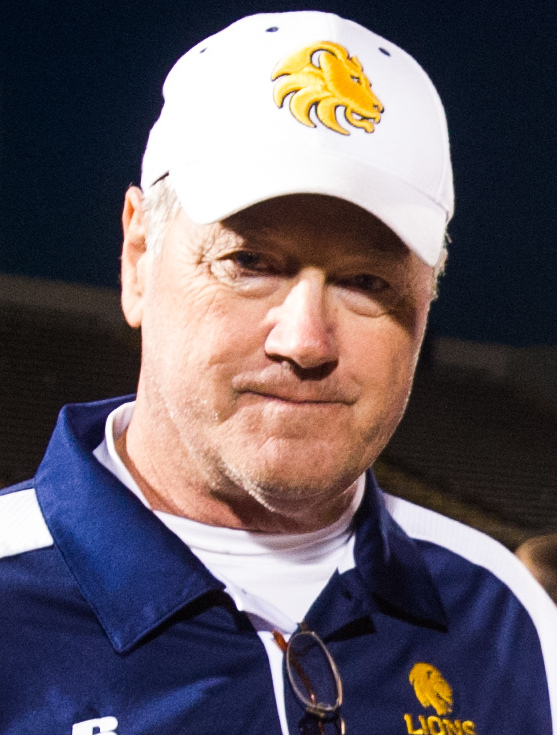
- Carthel in 2014

Current position
- Title: Special teams quality control
- Team: Stephen F. Austin
- Conference: Southland

Biographical details
- Born: July 6, 1952 (age 74); Dimmitt, Texas, U.S.

Playing career
- 1970–1973: Eastern New Mexico
- Positions: Center, kicker

Coaching career (HC unless noted)
- 1975–1976: Floydada HS (TX) (DC)
- 1977–1979: Dubuque (DC)
- 1980: Boswell HS (TX) (DC)
- 1981–1982: Lubbock Christian
- 1983–1984: UTEP (OL/ST)
- 1985–1991: Eastern New Mexico
- 2004–2005: Amarillo Dusters
- 2005–2012: West Texas A&M
- 2015–2018: Texas A&M–Commerce (STQC)
- 2019–present: Stephen F. Austin (STQC)

Head coaching record
- Overall: 124–69–1 (college)
- Bowls: 2–0
- Tournaments: 6–6 (NCAA D-II playoffs)

Accomplishments and honors

Championships
- 5 Lone Star (1991, 2005–2007, 2012); 1 Intense Football League (2004)

Awards
- AFCA Region Four Coach of the Year (2007)

Donald Ray Carthel (born July 6, 1952) is an American football coach. He is an assistant coach in charge special teams quality control at Stephen F. Austin State University. Carthel served as head football coach at Lubbock Christian College—now Lubbock Christian University—from 1981 to 1982, Eastern New Mexico University from 1985 to 1991, and West Texas A&M University from 2005 to 2012, compiling a career college football coaching record of 124–69–1. He is also the father of Stephen F. Austins' head football coach, Colby Carthel.

== Early years ==
After playing four years at Eastern New Mexico University, Carthel began his coaching career under coach L. G. Wilson at Floydada High School in Floydada, Texas. He later coached at University of Dubuque in Dubuque, Iowa, and Boswell High School in Fort Worth, Texas, until getting his first head coach job at Lubbock Christian College (now Lubbock Christian University).

== Head coaching career ==
=== Lubbock Christian ===
Carthel coached the Lubbock Christian football team from 1981-1982, compiling a record of 1-19. He resigned and then took a job as an assistant coach at the University of Texas at El Paso under coach Bill Yung.

=== Eastern New Mexico ===
In 1985 Carthel took over head coaching duties at his alma mater Eastern New Mexico. In his seven seasons the Greyhounds had only one losing season. After a 5–5 record in Carthel's initial season, the Greyhounds were 8–3 in 1986 and 9–2 in '87. They were 2–8 in 1988, but followed with records of 7–3, 6–4 and 7–3–1. In five of Carthel's seven years, the Greyhounds were ranked in the Division II Top 20 Poll. In 1991, the ENMU won the Lone Star Conference championship. Carthel was inducted into the ENMU Hall of Fame in 2001.

Having reached the pinnacle of his career as a head coach, Carthel chose to retire at age 39, and moved back to the family farm in Friona, Texas. He took a pause from football coaching for nine years, before becoming a volunteer coach at Abilene Christian University under head coach Gary Gaines in 2000. Trying to become a head coach again, Carthel applied for the vacant West Texas A&M job in late 2001, but athletic director Ed Harris opted for Ronnie Jones. In 2004 Carthel was named the head coach and general manager of the Amarillo Dusters in their inaugural season in the Intense Football League. Amarillo posted a 15–3 record under Carthel and won the IFL Championship that year.

=== West Texas A&M ===
West Texas A&M fired Jones after three unsuccessful seasons, thus Carthel applied for the job again. This time, he was selected as head coach. In his first year, he guided the school to its first Lone Star Conference Championship in 19 years. He then compiled a 33–5 record, which is the highest winning percentage of any West Texas A&M coach since Alonzo P. George's 3–0 record in 1918. As of 2008, only Joe Kerbel (68–42–1) and Frank Kimbrough (54–52–2) won more games for West Texas A&M than Carthel. He also hired his son Colby Carthel as the Defensive coordinator in 2006.

At West Texas A&M, Carthel ran an “Air-Raid offense” very similar to Mike Leach's offense at nearby Texas Tech. After guiding West Texas A&M to its second undefeated regular season in school history, Carthel was named 2007 American Football Coaches Association (AFCA) Region Four Coach of the year.

==== Dismissal From West Texas A&M ====
On August 22, 2013, it was announced that Carthel had been fired by the university. According to West Texas A&M University officials, Carthel misled WT officials about paying for game tickets to a Texas Rangers baseball game during Lone Star Conference Media Days. Carthel did indeed purchase the tickets, but was promptly reimbursed by the two players that he bought the tickets for. The school then terminated him immediately, citing a violation of NCAA rules.

=== Texas A&M-Commerce ===
Carthel's son Colby was named head coach at Lone Star Conference rival Texas A&M-Commerce in 2013. Colby hired Don as a quality control assistant coach in 2015 and he was on staff during the Lions' 2017 National Championship season.

== Head coaching record ==
=== College ===
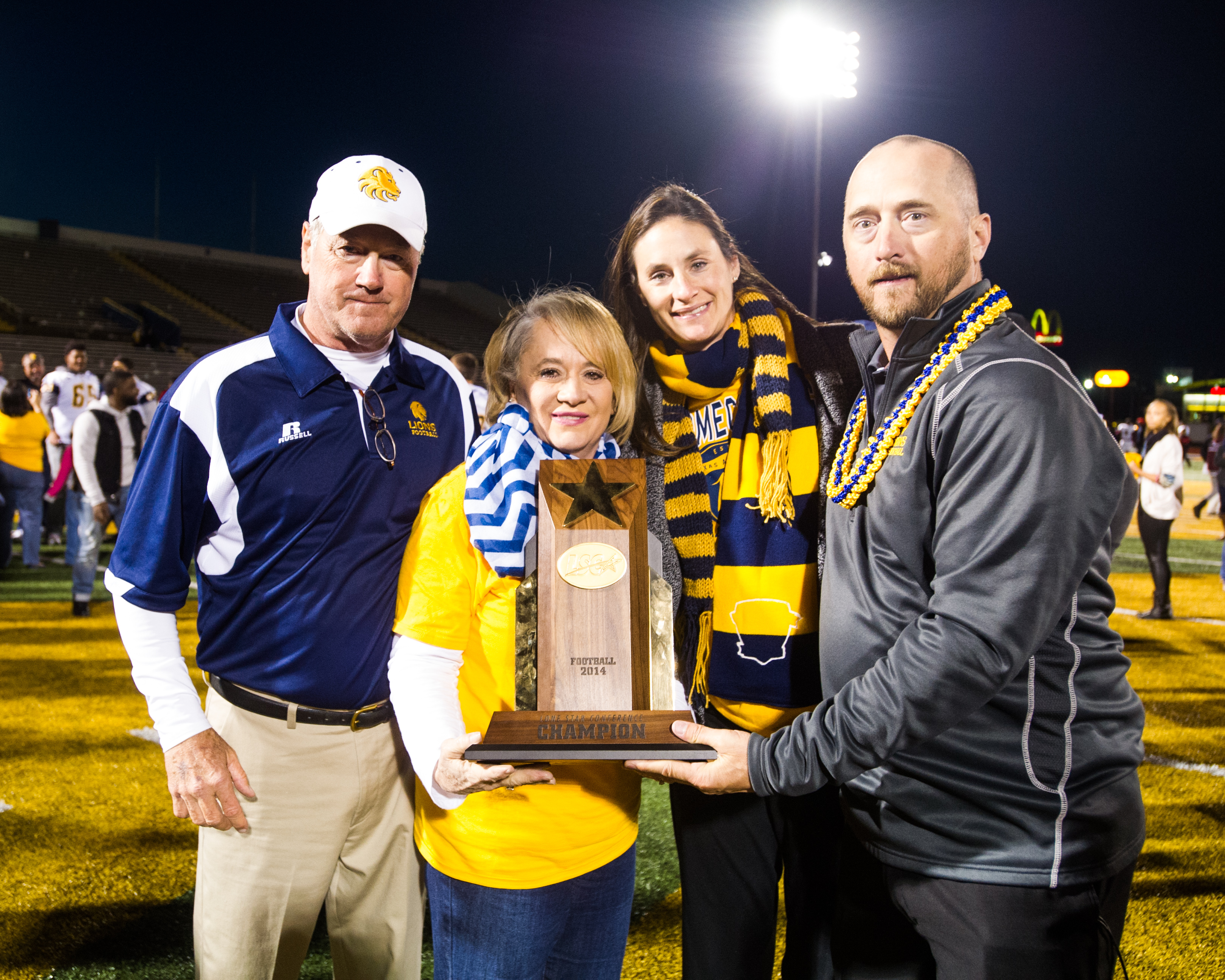
Don Carthel with his wife (Cindy), daughter in law (Sarah) and son (Colby) as they celebrate Colby's first LSC title as a head coach

Year	Team	Overall	Conference	Standing	Bowl/playoffs
Lubbock Christian Chaparrals (Texas Intercollegiate Athletic Association) (1981–1982)
1981	Lubbock Christian	1–9	1–9	6th	
1982	Lubbock Christian	0–10	0–8	5th	
Lubbock Christian:		1–19	1–17		
Eastern New Mexico Greyhounds (Lone Star Conference) (1985–1991)
1985	Eastern New Mexico	5–5	3–2	T–2nd	
1986	Eastern New Mexico	8–3	3–3	T–4th	
1987	Eastern New Mexico	9–2	3–2	3rd	
1988	Eastern New Mexico	2–8	2–8	8th	
1989	Eastern New Mexico	7–3	5–2	T–2nd	
1990	Eastern New Mexico	6–4	5–2	T–2nd	
1991	Eastern New Mexico	7–3–1	5–1	1st	
Eastern New Mexico:		44–28–1	26–20		
West Texas A&M Buffaloes (Lone Star Conference) (2005–present)
2005	West Texas A&M	10–2	8–1 / 6–1	1st / 1st (South)	L NCAA Division II Second Round
2006	West Texas A&M	11–2	8–1 / 5–1	1st / T–1st (South)	L NCAA Division II Second Round
2007	West Texas A&M	12–1	9–0 / 6–0	1st / 1st (South)	L NCAA Division II Second Round
2008	West Texas A&M	11–2	8–1 / 5–1	2nd / 2nd (South)	L NCAA Division II Second Round
2009	West Texas A&M	7–5	6–3 / 4–2	T–4th / T–1st (South)	W Kanza Bowl
2010	West Texas A&M	8–4	8–2 / 4–2	3rd / 3rd (South)	L NCAA Division II First Round
2011	West Texas A&M	8–3	6–2	3rd	W Kanza Bowl
2012	West Texas A&M	12–3	7–1	T–1st	L NCAA Division II Semifinal
West Texas A&M:		79–22	60–11		
Total:		124–69–1			
National championship Conference title Conference division title or championship game berth
