= 2006 West Texas A&M Buffaloes football team =

American college football season

2006 West Texas A&M Buffaloes football

LSC South Division champion LSC champion

NCAA Division II Second Round, L 17–43 vs. Chadron State
- Conference: Lone Star Conference
- South Division

Ranking
- AFCA: No. 10
- Record: 11–2 (8–1 LSC)
- Head coach: Don Carthel (2nd season)
- Co-offensive coordinator: Scott Parr (1st season)
- Offensive scheme: Air raid
- Defensive coordinator: Colby Carthel (1st season)
- Base defense: 3–4
- Home stadium: Kimbrough Memorial Stadium

2006 Lone Star Conference football standings
	Conf.			Overall
Team	W		L	W		L
Overall*
No. 10 W. Texas A&M $^	8	–	1	11	–	2
No. 17 Midwestern St. ^	7	–	2	10	–	3
No. 20 Abilene Christian ^	7	–	2	8	–	3
Tarleton State	6	–	3	6	–	4
SE Oklahoma State	5	–	4	6	–	4
Central Oklahoma	4	–	5	5	–	6
SW Oklahoma State	4	–	5	6	–	5
Northeastern State	4	–	5	4	–	6
Texas A&M–Commerce	4	–	5	5	–	5
Texas A&M–Kingsville	2	–	7	3	–	8
East Central	2	–	7	2	–	8
Eastern New Mexico	2	–	7	3	–	7
Angelo State	2	–	7	3	–	7
North Division
SE Oklahoma State x	4	–	1	6	–	4
SW Oklahoma State	3	–	2	6	–	5
Northeastern State	3	–	2	4	–	6
Texas A&M–Commerce	2	–	3	5	–	5
Central Oklahoma	2	–	3	5	–	6
East Central	1	–	4	2	–	8
South Division
No. 10 W. Texas A&M x$^	5	–	1	11	–	2
Tarleton State x	5	–	1	6	–	4
No. 17 Midwestern St. ^	4	–	2	10	–	3
No. 20 Abilene Christian ^	4	–	2	8	–	3
Angelo State	2	–	4	3	–	7
Eastern New Mexico	1	–	5	3	–	7
Texas A&M–Kingsville	0	–	6	3	–	8
$ – Conference champion; ^ – NCAA Division II playoff participant; * – The LSC counted separate overall and division standings.; Rankings from AFCA Poll

The 2006 West Texas A&M Buffaloes football team represented West Texas A&M University during the 2006 NCAA Division II football season as a member of the Lone Star Conference (LSC). The Buffaloes were led by second-year head coach Don Carthel and played their home games at Kimbrough Memorial Stadium in Canyon, Texas.

For a second-straight season, the Buffaloes won both the LSC South Division and the Lone Star Conference. The team received a bid to the Division II playoffs, losing to Chadron State in the second round.

== Offseason ==
=== Coaching changes ===
Defensive coordinator Mike Salinas took a position with the Sam Houston Bearkats after just one season with the Buffaloes. Colby Carthel, son of head coach Don Carthel, was named the Buffaloes' new defensive coordinator.

Tarleton State wide receivers coach Scott Parr was hired as co-offensive coordinator.

== Schedule ==
Date	Time	Opponent	Rank	Site	Result	Attendance
August 31	7:00 p.m.	Mesa State*	No. 10	Kimbrough Memorial Stadium; Canyon, TX	W 44–14	10,371
September 9	6:00 p.m.	Adams State*	No. 9	Kimbrough Memorial Stadium; Canyon, TX	W 31–11	9,031
September 16	6:00 p.m.	at Texas A&M–Commerce	No. 9	Memorial Stadium; Commerce, TX (East Texas vs. West Texas)	W 35–10	2,934
September 23	6:00 p.m.	Northeastern State	No. 7	Kimbrough Memorial Stadium; Canyon, TX	W 14–10	9,842
September 30	7:00 p.m.	at Texas A&M–Kingsville	No. 7	Javelina Stadium; Kingsville, TX	W 51–31	7,500
October 7	6:00 p.m.	No. 24 Midwestern State^{†}	No. 6	Kimbrough Memorial Stadium; Canyon, TX	W 29–27	16,481
October 14	7:00 p.m.	at Eastern New Mexico	No. 6	Greyhound Stadium; Portales, NM (Wagon Wheel)	W 21–14	7,200
October 19	7:00 p.m.	No. 20 Abilene Christian	No. 4	Kimbrough Memorial Stadium; Canyon, TX	L 33–49	13,641
October 28	6:00 p.m.	at Angelo State	No. 13	San Angelo Stadium; San Angelo, TX	W 26–10	3,942
November 4	6:00 p.m.	at Central Oklahoma	No. 12	Chad Richison Stadium; Edmond, TX	W 38–7	4,116
November 18	12:00 p.m.	No. 22 Abilene Christian*	No. 9	Kimbrough Memorial Stadium; Canyon, TX (NCAA Division II First Round)	W 30–27 ^{OT}	4,448
November 25	1:00 p.m.	at No. 7 Chadron State*	No. 9	Elliott Field; Chadron, NE (NCAA Division II Second Round)	L 17–43	4,000
*Non-conference game; ^{†}Homecoming; Rankings from AFCA Poll released prior to the game; All times are in Central time

== Rankings ==
Ranking movements Legend: ██ Increase in ranking ██ Decrease in ranking
	Week													
Poll	Pre	1	2	3	4	5	6	7	8	9	10	11	12	Final
AFCA	11	10	9	9	7	7	6	6	4	13	12	10	9	10

== Game summaries ==
=== Adams State ===
Adams State Grizzlies at No. 9 West Texas A&M Buffaloes – Game summary

Quarter	1	2	3	4	Total
Grizzlies	0	3	0	8	11
No. 9 Buffaloes	0	17	14	0	31

at Kimbrough Memorial Stadium, Canyon, Texas

- Date: September 9
- Game time: 6:00 p.m. CDT
- Game weather: Sunny, 72 °F (22 °C)
- Game attendance: 9,031
- Referee: Reggie Anderson
- Box score

Statistics	ASC	WTAMU
First downs	15	19
Total yards	267	405
Rushing yards	81	127
Passing yards	186	278
Turnovers	1	1
Time of possession	28:30	31:30

Team	Category	Player	Statistics
Adams State	Passing	Clint Buderus	8/16, 79 yards
Adams State	Rushing	Clint Buderus	12 rushes, 53 yards
Adams State	Receiving	Gene Mejia	8 receptions, 99 yards
West Texas A&M	Passing	Dalton Bell	24/40, 247 yards, 3 TD
West Texas A&M	Rushing	Maurice White	9 rushes, 85 yards
West Texas A&M	Receiving	Charly Martin	6 receptions, 69 yards, TD

=== No. 24 Midwestern State ===
No. 24 Midwestern State Mustangs at No. 6 West Texas A&M Buffaloes – Game summary

Quarter	1	2	3	4	Total
No. 24 Mustangs	0	13	7	7	27
No. 6 Buffaloes	0	14	3	12	29

at Kimbrough Memorial Stadium, Canyon, Texas

- Date: October 7
- Game time: 6:00 p.m. CDT
- Game weather: Clear and windy, 79 °F (26 °C)
- Game attendance: 16,481
- Referee: Mark Windham
- Box score, Recap

Game information
First quarter
- No scoring plays

Second quarter

- MSU – DelJuan Lee 9-yard run (Kristian Foster kick), 13:36. Mustangs 7–0. Drive: 9 plays, 95 yards, 3:43.
- WTAMU – Charly Martin 16-yard pass from Dalton Bell (Luis Villagomez kick), 6:39. Tied 7–7. Drive: 7 plays, 47 yards, 1:39.
- MSU – Ulysses Odoms 5-yard pass from Daniel Polk (kick blocked), 3:07. Mustangs 13–7. Drive: 7 plays, 80 yards, 3:24.
- WTAMU – Maurice White 8-yard pass from Dalton Bell (Luis Villagomez kick), 0:37. Buffaloes 14–13. Drive: 10 plays, 80 yards, 2:25.

Third quarter

- WTAMU – Luis Villagomez 31-yard field goal, 8:47. Buffaloes 17–13. Drive: 12 plays, 62 yards, 6:01.
- MSU – DelJuan Lee 33-yard pass from Rahsaan Bell (Kristian Foster kick), 5:50. Mustangs 20–17. Drive: 6 plays, 70 yards, 2:45.

Fourth quarter

- WTAMU – Shawn Scott-Jones 30-yard pass from Dalton Bell (kick blocked), 12:19. Buffaloes 23–20. Drive: 10 plays, 70 yards, 4:19.
- MSU – Keith Flanagan 16-yard pass from Rahsaan Bell (Kristian Foster kick), 10:59. Mustangs 27–23. Drive: 3 plays, 45 yards, 1:05.
- WTAMU – Kolo Kapanui 1-yard pass from Dalton Bell (kick failed), 2:30. Buffaloes 29–27. Drive: 9 plays, 52 yards, 5:08.

Statistics	MSU	WTAMU
First downs	17	27
Total yards	422	402
Rushing yards	51	66
Passing yards	371	36
Turnovers	2	1
Time of possession	25:04	34:56

Team	Category	Player	Statistics
Midwestern State	Passing	Rahsaan Bell	17/24, 194 yards, 2 TD, INT
Midwestern State	Rushing	Daniel Polk	5 rushes, 21 yards
Midwestern State	Receiving	DelJuan Lee	6 receptions, 170 yards, TD
West Texas A&M	Passing	Dalton Bell	42/58, 336 yards, 4 TD, INT
West Texas A&M	Rushing	Maurice White	16 rushes, 62 yards
West Texas A&M	Receiving	Charly Martin	7 receptions, 89 yards, TD

=== At Eastern New Mexico ===
No. 6 West Texas A&M Buffaloes at Eastern New Mexico Greyhounds – Game summary

Quarter	1	2	3	4	Total
No. 6 Buffaloes	0	0	14	7	21
Greyhounds	0	14	0	0	14

at Greyhound Stadium, Portales, New Mexico

- Date: October 14
- Game time: 7:00 p.m. CDT/6:00 p.m. MDT
- Game weather: Rainy and overcast
- Game attendance: 7,200
- Referee: Mark Denny
- Box score

Game information
First quarter
- No scoring pays

Second quarter

- ENMU – Michael Benton 1-yard run (Lee Price kick), 9:33. Greyhounds 7–0. Drive: 8 plays, 47 yards, 3:51.
- ENMU – Michael Fields 52-yard interception return (Lee Price kick), 1:34. Greyhounds 14–0.

Third quarter

- WTAMU – Jordan Jones 87-yard kickoff return (Luis Villagomez kick), 14:44. Greyhounds 14–7.
- WTAMU – Shawn Scott-Jones 3-yard pass from Dalton Bell (Luis Villagomez kick), 9:36. Tied 14–14. Drive: 5 plays, 25 yards, 2:41.

Fourth quarter

- WTAMU – Shawn Scott-Jones 3-yard pass from Dalton Bell (Luis Villagomez kick), 8:25. Buffaloes 21–14. Drive: 16 plays, 96 yards, 5:51.

Statistics	WTAMU	ENMU
First downs	20	10
Total yards	375	194
Rushing yards	116	176
Passing yards	259	18
Turnovers	5	1
Time of possession	28:04	31:56

Team	Category	Player	Statistics
West Texas A&M	Passing	Dalton Bell	25/33, 259 yards, 2 TD, 2 INT
West Texas A&M	Rushing	Maurice White	21 rushes, 148 yards
West Texas A&M	Receiving	Charly Martin	4 receptions, 103 yards
Eastern New Mexico	Passing	Michael Benton	2/3, 18 yards
Eastern New Mexico	Rushing	Michael Benton	20 rushes, 69 yards, TD
Eastern New Mexico	Receiving	Zach Gerleve	1 reception, 9 yards

=== At Angelo State ===
No. 13 West Texas A&M Buffaloes at Angelo State Rams – Game summary

Quarter	1	2	3	4	Total
No. 13 Buffaloes	0	6	6	14	26
Rams	3	0	0	7	10

at San Angelo Stadium, San Angelo, Texas

- Date: October 28
- Game time: 6:00 p.m. CDT
- Game weather: Clear and breezy, 75 °F (24 °C)
- Game attendance: 3,942
- Referee: Al Skuza
- Box score

Game information
First quarter
- ASU – J. D. Williams 22-yard field goal, 5:00. Rams 3–0. Drive: 10 plays, 75 yards, 5:53.

Second quarter

- WTAMU – Shawn Scott-Jones 17-yard pass from Dalton Bell (kick failed), 2:27. Buffaloes 6–3. Drive: 14 plays, 99 yards, 6:16.

Third quarter

- WTAMU – Ramon Perry 23-yard pass from Dalton Bell (kick failed), 5:22. Buffaloes 12–3. Drive: 8 plays, 71 yards, 3:09.

Fourth quarter

- WTAMU – Shawn Scott-Jones 6-yard pass from Dalton Bell (Luis Villagomez kick), 12:37. Buffaloes 19–3. Drive: 12 plays, 80 yards, 4:28.
- WTAMU – Michael Ford 4-yard run (Luis Villagomez kick), 8:00. Buffaloes 26–3. Drive: 6 plays, 55 yards, 2:50.
- ASU – Sam Tindol 11-yard pass from Trey Weishuhn (J. D. Williams kick), 4:48. Buffaloes 26–10. Drive: 9 plays, 80 yards, 3:02.

Statistics	WTAMU	ASU
First downs	29	14
Total yards	530	210
Rushing yards	86	46
Passing yards	444	164
Turnovers	2	0
Time of possession	31:54	28:06

Team	Category	Player	Statistics
West Texas A&M	Passing	Dalton Bell	44/57, 444 yards, 3 TD, 2 INT
West Texas A&M	Rushing	Maurice White	15 rushes, 66 yards
West Texas A&M	Receiving	Ramon Perry	11 receptions, 131 yards, TD
Angelo State	Passing	Trey Weishuhn	16/25, 164 yards, TD
Angelo State	Rushing	Daniel Thomas	15 rushes, 62 yards
Angelo State	Receiving	Chris Fowler	3 receptions, 50 yards

=== At No. 7 Chadron State (NCAA Division II Second Round) ===
No. 9 West Texas A&M Buffaloes at No. 7 Chadron State (NCAA Division II Second Round) – Game summary

Quarter	1	2	3	4	Total
No. 9 Buffaloes	14	3	0	0	17
No. 7 Eagles	7	5	17	14	43

at Elliott Field, Chadron, Nebraska

- Date: November 25
- Game time: 1:00 p.m. CST/12:00 p.m. MST
- Game weather: Mostly cloudy, 40 °F (4 °C)
- Game attendance: 4,000
- Referee: Justin Ingalls
- Box score

Game information
First quarter
- WTAMU – Shawn Scott-Jones 2-yard pass from Dalton Bell (Jason Roberts kick), 12:52. Buffaloes 7–0. Drive: 3 plays, 28 yards, 0:52.
- CSC – Danny Woodhead 22-yard run (Travis Atter kick), 7:21. Tied 7–7. Drive: 11 plays, 80 yards, 5:26.
- WTAMU – Charly Martin 2-yard pass from Dalton Bell (Jason Roberts kick), 2:25. Buffaloes 14–7. Drive: 11 plays, 79 yards, 4:52.

Second quarter

- WTAMU – Jason Roberts 29-yard field goal, 12:59. Buffaloes 17–7. Drive: 6 plays, 15 yards, 2:17.
- CSC – Travis Atter 35-yard field goal, 9:23. Buffaloes 17–10. Drive: 8 plays, 48 yards, 3:25.
- CSC – Dalton Bell sacked in own end zone, 7:19. Buffaloes 17–12.

Third quarter

- CSC – Danny Woodhead 8-yard pass from Tyler Hidrogo (Travis Atter kick), 9:35. Eagles 19–17. Drive: 4 plays, 49 yards, 2:02.
- CSC – Danny Woodhead 8-yard run (Travis Atter kick), 3:27. Eagles 26–17. Drive: 10 plays, 60 yards, 4:33.
- CSC – Travis Atter 35-yard field goal, 0:30. Eagles 29–17. Drive: 4 plays, 0 yards, 1:00.

Fourth quarter

- CSC – Danny Woodhead 2-yard run (Travis Atter kick), 12:30. Eagles 36–17. Drive: 5 plays, 24 yards, 2:16.
- CSC – Joel Schommer 11-yard run (Travis Atter kick), 9:20. Eagles 43–17. Drive: 2 plays, 14 yards, 1:02.

Statistics	WTAMU	CSC
First downs	14	21
Total yards	164	407
Rushing yards	-14	295
Passing yards	178	112
Turnovers	2	2
Time of possession	26:49	27:33

Team	Category	Player	Statistics
West Texas A&M	Passing	Dalton Bell	24/42, 178 yards, 2 TD
West Texas A&M	Rushing	Michael Ford	5 rushes, 32 yards
West Texas A&M	Receiving	Ramon Perry	8 receptions, 58 yards
Chadron State	Passing	Tyler Hidrogo	7/13, 81 yards, TD
Chadron State	Rushing	Danny Woodhead	35 rushes, 252 yards, 3 TD
Chadron State	Receiving	Logan Stropko	4 receptions, 42 yards
