= Carthel =

Carthel is a surname. Notable people with the surname include:

- Colby Carthel (born 1976), American football coach
- Don Carthel (born 1952), American football coach, father of Colby
