= 2006 North Alabama Lions football team =

American college football season

2006 North Alabama Lions football

GSC champion

NCAA Division II Quarterfinal, L 10–27 vs. Delta State
- Conference: Gulf South Conference
- Record: 11–1 (8–0 GSC)
- Head coach: Mark Hudspeth (5th season)
- Offensive coordinator: Kenny Edenfield (5th season)
- Defensive coordinator: Karl Morgan (2nd season)
- Home stadium: Braly Municipal Stadium

2006 Gulf South Conference football standings
	Conf.			Overall
Team	W		L	W		L
No. 6 North Alabama $^	8	–	0	11	–	1
No. 3 Delta State ^	7	–	1	12	–	3
No. 14 Valdosta State	6	–	2	8	–	2
Henderson State	6	–	2	8	–	3
Arkansas Tech	5	–	3	7	–	3
Harding	5	–	3	6	–	4
West Alabama	3	–	5	6	–	5
Ouachita Baptist	1	–	7	2	–	8
Southern Arkansas	1	–	7	2	–	9
West Georgia	1	–	7	1	–	9
Arkansas–Monticello	1	–	7	1	–	10
$ – Conference champion; ^ – NCAA Division II playoff participant; Rankings from AFCA poll

The 2006 North Alabama Lions football team represented the University of North Alabama as a member of the Gulf South Conference (GSC) during the 2006 NCAA Division II football season. Led by fifth-year head coach Mark Hudspeth, the Lions compiled an overall record of 11–1 with a mark of 8–0 in conference play, winning the GSC title. For the second straight season, North Alabama advanced to the NCAA Division II football championship playoffs, where, after a first round by, the Lions defeated Newberry in the second round before losing to GSC runner-up Delta State in the quarterfinals. The team played home games at Braly Municipal Stadium in Florence, Alabama.

== Schedule ==
Date	Time	Opponent	Rank	Site	TV	Result	Attendance
September 9	6:00 p.m.	at Tusculum*	No. 3	Pioneer Field; Greeneville, TN		W 22–10	2,897
September 14	7:00 p.m.	Harding	No. 3	Braly Stadium; Florence, AL	CSS	W 41–14	11,051
September 23	6:00 p.m.	at Arkansas Tech	No. 3	Braly Stadium; Florence, AL		W 27–20	9,755
September 30	6:00 p.m.	Southern Arkansas	No. 3	Braly Stadium; Florence, AL		W 27–8	7,725
October 7	6:00 p.m.	Ouachita Baptist	No. 3	Braly Stadium; Florence, AL		W 47–10	2,750
October 14	3:00 p.m.	at Arkansas–Monticello	No. 3	Convoy Leslie–Cotton Boll Stadium; Monticello, AR		W 47–7	10,174
October 21	4:00 p.m.	Delta State*	No. 3	Braly Stadium; Florence, AL	CSS	W 17–10	7,098
October 28	12:00 p.m.	at No. 12 Valdosta State	No. 3	Bazemore–Hyder Stadium; Valdosta, GA	CSTV Online	W 31–24 ^{OT}	12,347
November 4	6:00 p.m.	West Georgia^{†}	No. 3	Braly Stadium; Florence, AL		W 26–16	4,404
November 11	6:00 p.m.	West Alabama	No. 3	Braly Stadium; Florence, AL (rivalry)		W 45–3	6,815
November 25	12:00 p.m.	No. 12 Newberry*	No. 3	Braly Stadium; Florence, AL (NCAA Division II Second Round)		W 38–20	9,142
December 2	12:00 p.m.	No. 11 Delta State*	No. 3	Braly Stadium; Florence, AL (NCAA Division II Quarterfinal)		L 10–27	8,079
*Non-conference game; ^{†}Homecoming; Rankings from AFCA Poll released prior to the game; All times are in Central time

== Game summaries ==
=== Tusculum ===
	1	2	3	4	Total
Lions	3	0	19	0	22
Pioneers	7	3	0	0	10

=== Harding ===
	1	2	3	4	Total
Bison	0	7	0	7	14
Lions	14	20	0	7	41

=== Arkansas Tech ===
	1	2	3	4	Total
Wonderboys	0	7	0	7	14
Lions	3	7	7	21	38

=== Southern Arkansas ===
	1	2	3	4	Total
Muleriders	0	0	0	8	8
Lions	7	7	6	7	27

=== Ouachita Baptist ===
	1	2	3	4	Total
Tigers					0
Lions					0

=== Arkansas–Monticello ===
	1	2	3	4	Total
Lions					0
Boll Weevils					0

=== Delta State ===
	1	2	3	4	Total
Statesmen	3	7	0	0	10
Lions	0	10	7	0	17

=== Valdosta State ===
	1	2	3	4	Total
Lions					0
Blazers					0

=== West Georgia ===
	1	2	3	4	Total
Wolves					0
Lions					0

=== West Alabama ===
	1	2	3	4	Total
Tigers	3	0	0	0	3
No. 3 Lions	21	10	14	0	45

=== Newberry ===
	1	2	3	4	Total
No. 12 Wolves	7	6	7	0	20
No. 3 Lions	3	21	0	14	38

=== at Delta State ===
	1	2	3	4	Total
No. 3 Lions	0	3	0	7	10
No. 12 Statesmen	7	6	7	7	27
