= 2006 NCAA Division II football rankings =

The 2006 NCAA Division II football rankings are from the American Football Coaches Association (AFCA). This is for the 2006 season.

== Legend ==
	Increase in ranking
	Decrease in ranking
	Not ranked previous week
(#–#)	Win–loss record
(Italics)	Number of first place votes
т	Tied with team above or below also with this symbol

== American Football Coaches Association poll ==
	Preseason	Week 1 Aug 30	Week 2 Sept 6	Week 3 Sept 13	Week 4 Sept 20	Week 5 Sept 27	Week 6 Oct 4	Week 7 Oct 11	Week 8 Oct 18	Week 9 Oct 25	Week 10 Nov 1	Week 11 Nov 8	Week 12 Nov 15	Week 13 Postseason	
1.	Grand Valley State (28)	Grand Valley State (0–0) (28)	Grand Valley State (1–0) (28)	Grand Valley State (2–0) (26)	Grand Valley State (3–0) (26)	Grand Valley State (4–0) (26)	Grand Valley State (5–0) (27)	Grand Valley State (6–0) (27)	Grand Valley State (7–0) (27)	Grand Valley State (8–0) (26)	Grand Valley State (9–0) (26)	Grand Valley State (10–0) (25)	Grand Valley State (11–0)	Grand Valley State (15–0) (28)	1.
2.	Northwest Missouri State	Northwest Missouri State (0–0)	Northwest Missouri State (1–0)	Northwest Missouri State (2–0) (14)	Northwest Missouri State (3–0) (1)	Northwest Missouri State (4–0) (1)	Northwest Missouri State (5–0) (1)	Northwest Missouri State (6–0) (1)	Northwest Missouri State (7–0) (1)	Northwest Missouri State (8–0) (1)	Northwest Missouri State (9–0) (1)	Northwest Missouri State (10–0) (2)	Northwest Missouri State (11–0)	Northwest Missouri State (14–1)	2.
3.	North Alabama	North Alabama (0–0)	North Alabama (0–0)	North Alabama (1–0)	North Alabama (2–0)	North Alabama (3–0)	North Alabama (4–0)	North Alabama (5–0)	North Alabama (6–0)	North Alabama (7–0) (1)	North Alabama (8–0) (1)	North Alabama (9–0) (1)	North Alabama (10–0)	Delta State (12–3)	3.
4.	North Dakota т	North Dakota (0–0)	North Dakota (1–0)	North Dakota (2–0) (1)	North Dakota (3–0) (1)	North Dakota (4–0) (1)	North Dakota (5–0)	North Dakota (6–0)	West Texas A&M (7–0)	North Carolina Central (8–0)	North Carolina Central (9–0)	North Carolina Central (10–0)	North Carolina Central (11–0)	Bloomsburg (12–2)	4.
5.	Saginaw Valley State т	Saginaw Valley State (0–0)	Saginaw Valley State (1–0)	Saginaw Valley State (2–0)	Valdosta State (2–0)	Valdosta State (3–0)	Valdosta State (4–0)	Valdosta State (5–0)	Shepherd (6–0)	Shepherd (7–0)	Shepherd (8–0)	Shepherd (9–0)	Shepherd (10–0)	Chadron State (12–1)	5.
6.	Valdosta State	Valdosta State (0–0)	Valdosta State (1–0)	Valdosta State (2–0)	Carson–Newman (3–0)	Carson–Newman (4–0)	West Texas A&M (5–0)	West Texas A&M (6–0)	North Carolina Central (7–0)	Bloomsburg (7–1)	Bloomsburg (8–1)	Bloomsburg (9–1)	Bloomsburg (10–1)	North Alabama (11–1)	6.
7.	Bloomsburg	Bloomsburg (0–0)	Pittsburg State (1–0)	Pittsburg State (2–0)	West Texas A&M (3–0)	West Texas A&M (4–0)	Shepherd (5–0)	Shepherd (5–0)	Bloomsburg (6–1)	Nebraska–Omaha (6–1)	Nebraska–Omaha (7–1)	Chadron State (10–0)	Chadron State (11–0)	North Dakota (11–2)	7.
8.	Pittsburg State	Pittsburg State (0–0)	Carson–Newman (1–0)	Carson–Newman (2–0)	South Dakota (3–0)	South Dakota (4–0)	Bloomsburg (4–1)	Bloomsburg (5–1)	Nebraska–Omaha (5–1)	Pittsburg State (7–1)	Pittsburg State (8–1)	North Dakota (8–1)	North Dakota (9–1)	Shepherd (11–1)	8.
9.	Albany State	Carson–Newman (0–0)	West Texas A&M (1–0)	West Texas A&M (2–0)	Shepherd (3–0)	Shepherd (4–0)	North Carolina Central (5–0)	North Carolina Central (6–0)	Northwood (6–0)	Chadron State (8–0)	Chadron State (9–0)	Newberry (10–0)	West Texas A&M (10–1)	North Carolina Central (11–1)	9.
10.	Carson–Newman	West Texas A&M (0–0)	Nebraska–Omaha (1–0)	Southeastern Oklahoma State (2–0)	Bloomsburg (2–1)	Bloomsburg (3–1)	Northwood (5–0)	Northwood (6–0)	Pittsburg State (6–1)	North Dakota (6–1)	North Dakota (7–1)	West Texas A&M (9–1)	Valdosta State (8–2)	West Texas A&M (11–2)	10.
11.	West Texas A&M	Nebraska–Omaha (0–0)	Southeastern Oklahoma State (1–0)	South Dakota (2–0)	Saginaw Valley State (2–1)	North Carolina Central (4–0)	Pittsburg State (4–1)	Pittsburg State (5–1)	North Dakota (6–1)	South Dakota (7–1)	Newberry (9–0)	Missouri Western State (9–1)	Delta State (9–2)	Nebraska–Omaha (8–3)	11.
12.	Nebraska–Omaha	Southeastern Oklahoma State (0–0)	South Dakota (1–0)	Bloomsburg (1–1)	North Carolina Central (3–0)	Saginaw Valley State (3–1)	Nebraska–Omaha (4–1)	Nebraska–Omaha (4–1)	Chadron State (7–0)	Valdosta State (6–1)	West Texas A&M (8–1)	Tiffin (10–0)	Newberry (10–1)	Newberry (11–2)	12.
13.	Southeastern Oklahoma State	South Dakota (0–0)	Bloomsburg (0–1)	Winona State (2–0)	Pittsburg State (2–1)	Pittsburg State (3–1)	Chadron State (5–0)	Chadron State (6–0)	South Dakota (6–1)	West Texas A&M (7–1)	Missouri Western State (8–1)	Valdosta State (7–2)	Nebraska–Omaha (8–2)	South Dakota (9–4)	13.
14.	Presbyterian	Presbyterian (1–0)	Shepherd (2–0)	Shepherd (2–0)	Northwood (3–0)	Northwood (4–0)	South Dakota (4–1)	South Dakota (5–1)	Valdosta State (5–1)	Abilene Christian (7–0)	Northwood (7–1)	Delta State (8–2)	Pittsburg State (9–2)	Valdosta State (8–2)	14.
15.	South Dakota	Shepherd (1–0)	Winona State (1–0)	North Carolina Central (3–0)	Catawba (3–0)	Catawba (3–0)	Carson–Newman (4–1)	Carson–Newman (5–1)	Delta State (6–1)	Newberry (8–0)	Tiffin (9–0)	South Dakota (8–2)	Missouri Western State (9–2)	Pittsburg State (10–2)	15.
16.	Shepherd	Washburn (0–0)	Washburn (1–0)	Delta State (2–0)	Missouri Western State (3–0)	Nebraska–Omaha (3–1)	Delta State (4–1)	Delta State (5–1)	Missouri Western State (6–1)	Missouri Western State (7–1)	Valdosta State (6–2)	Pittsburg State (8–2)	South Dakota (8–3)	Missouri Western State (9–3)	16.
17.	Washburn	Winona State (0–0)	California (PA) (1–0)	C.W. Post (2–0)	Nebraska–Omaha (2–1)	Chadron State (4–0)	Missouri Western State (4–1)	Missouri Western State (5–1)	Newberry (7–0)	Northwood (6–1)	Delta State (7–2)	Nebraska–Omaha (7–2)	Tiffin (10–1)	Midwestern State (10–3)	17.
18.	East Stroudsburg	East Stroudsburg (0–0)	North Carolina Central (2–0)	Northwood (2–0)	Arkansas Tech (3–0)	Delta State (3–1)	Newberry (5–0)	Newberry (6–0)	Winona State (6–1)	Tiffin (8–0)	IUP (7–1)	Abilene Christian (8–1)	Midwestern State (9–2)	Northwood (8–3)	18.
19.	Winona State	California (PA) (0–0)	Tuskegee (1–0)	Central Missouri State (2–0)	Southeastern Oklahoma State (2–1)	Missouri Western State (3–1)	Washburn (4–1)	Winona State (5–1)	Tiffin (7–0)	Delta State (6–2)	Abilene Christian (7–1)	Elizabeth City State (9–1)	Winona State (9–2)	Winona State (9–3)	19.
20.	California (PA)	Tuskegee (1–0)	C.W. Post (1–0)	Nebraska–Omaha (1–1)	Chadron State (3–0)	Washburn (3–1)	Winona State (4–1)	Tiffin (7–0)	Abilene Christian (6–0)	IUP (6–1)	South Dakota (7–2)	Winona State (8–2)	Northwood (8–2)	Abilene Christian (8–3)	20.
21.	Tuskegee	Ashland (0–0)	Delta State (1–0)	Catawba (2–0)	Delta State (2–1)	Winona State (3–1)	Tiffin (6–0)	Abilene Christian (5–0)	C.W. Post (6–1)	Carson–Newman (6–2)	Elizabeth City State (8–1)	Northwood (7–2)	Elizabeth City State (9–2)	Elizabeth City State (9–3)	21.
22.	C.W. Post	North Carolina Central (1–0)	Presbyterian (1–1)	Presbyterian (2–1)	Washburn (2–1)	C.W. Post (3–1)	C.W. Post (4–1)	C.W. Post (5–1)	Wingate (6–1)	Lane (7–1)	Winona State (7–2)	Midwestern State (8–2)	Abilene Christian (8–2)	Tiffin (10–1)	22.
23.	Ashland	Albany State (0–1)	Northwood (1–0)	Missouri Western State (2–0)	Winona State (2–1)	Tiffin (5–0)	Abilene Christian (4–0)	Saginaw Valley State (4–2)	Carson–Newman (5–2)	Elizabeth City State (7–1)	Midwestern State (7–2)	California (PA) (8–2)	Bemidji State (9–2)	Bemidji State (9–3)	23.
24.	Northwood	C.W. Post (0–0)	Central Missouri State (1–0)	Arkansas Tech (2–0)	C.W. Post (2–1)	Newberry (4–0)	Midwestern State (5–0)	Midwestern State (5–1)	IUP (5–1) (Note: In the actual printed polls, IUP was listed as Indiana (PA))	Winona State (6–2)	Wingate (7–2)	Bemidji State (8–2)	IUP (8–2)	West Chester (9–4)	24.
25.	Tarleton State	Northwood (0–0)	Catawba (1–0)	Washburn (1–1)	California (PA) (2–1)	Abilene Christian (3–0)	Saginaw Valley State (3–2)	Henderson State (5–1)	Lane (7–1)	Midwestern State (6–2)	C.W. Post (7–2)	IUP (7–2)	Carson–Newman (8–3)	IUP (8–2)	25.
	Preseason	Week 1 Aug 30	Week 2 Sept 6	Week 3 Sept 13	Week 4 Sept 20	Week 5 Sept 27	Week 6 Oct 4	Week 7 Oct 11	Week 8 Oct 18	Week 9 Oct 25	Week 10 Nov 1	Week 11 Nov 8	Week 12 Nov 15	Week 13 Postseason	
		Dropped: 25 Tarleton State	Dropped: 18 East Stroudsburg; 21 Ashland; 23 Albany State	Dropped: 17 California (PA); 19 Tuskegee	Dropped: 19 Central Missouri State; 22 Presbyterian	Dropped: 18 Arkansas Tech; 19 Southeastern Oklahoma State; 25 California (PA)	Dropped: 15 Catawba	Dropped: 19 Washburn	Dropped: 23 Saginaw Valley State; 24 Midwestern State; 25 Henderson State	Dropped: 21 C.W. Post; 22 Wingate	Dropped: 21 Carson–Newman; 22 Lane	Dropped: 24 Wingate; 25 C.W. Post	Dropped: 23 California (PA)	Dropped: 25 Carson–Newman	
