= L. G. Wilson =

American football coach and athletic director

L. G. Wilson (November 5, 1924; Anson, Texas – June 29, 2001) was an American high school head football coach and athletic director.

== Life ==
He graduated from Anson High School and Abilene Christian University (then College) in 1950, where he played football, baseball, and basketball. He was a World War II veteran, serving in the U.S. Navy from 1944 to 1945. He married Elaine Halbert in Sweetwater on June 16, 1949. He is buried in Plainview, Texas.

== Career ==
Wilson was a high school head football coach and athletic director at Winters (1960–1967), Floydada (1968–1982), and Tulia, Texas (1983–1990), retiring in 1990. He also coached at Brownfield, Weatherford, and Temple, Texas. As of the 2006 football season, he is tied for 45th place among Texas head football coaches in all-time wins with a record of 207 wins, 102 losses, and 12 ties.

In 1979, the Texas High School Coaches Association inducted Wilson into their hall of fame. In 1999, the Lubbock Avalanche-Journal newspaper named Wilson as one of the 60 most memorable contributors to South Plains athletics.

Wilson mentored many men who went on to become successful head coaches:

- Bill Grissom (Colorado City, Stanton, Breckenridge, Hamlin, Texas)
- Don Carthel (Lubbock Christian College, Eastern New Mexico University, West Texas A&M University)
