= 2006 Presbyterian Blue Hose football team =

American college football season

2006 Presbyterian Blue Hose football
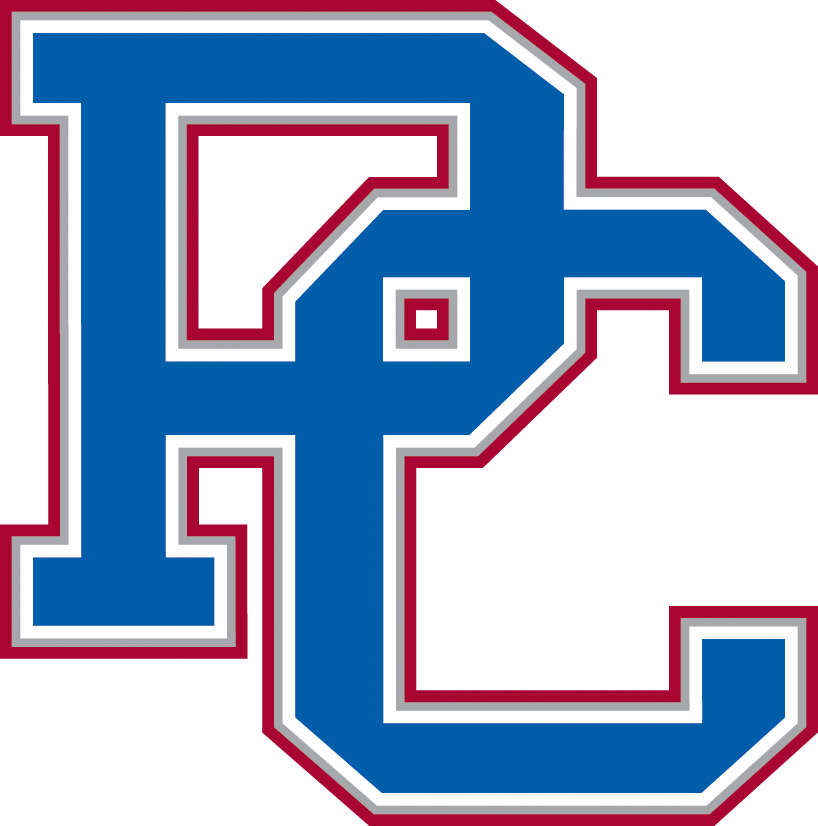
- Conference: South Atlantic Conference
- Record: 7–4 (5–2 SAC)
- Head coach: Tommy Spangler (6th season)
- Home stadium: Bailey Memorial Stadium

2006 South Atlantic Conference football standings
	Conf.			Overall
Team	W		L	W		L
No. 12 Newberry $^	6	–	1	11	–	2
Wingate	5	–	2	8	–	3
Presbyterian	5	–	2	7	–	4
Carson–Newman	4	–	3	8	–	3
Catawba	3	–	4	6	–	4
Tusculum	3	–	4	6	–	5
Mars Hill	1	–	6	4	–	7
Lenoir–Rhyne	1	–	6	3	–	8
$ – Conference champion; ^ – NCAA Division II playoff participant; Rankings from AFCA poll

The 2006 Presbyterian Blue Hose football team represented Presbyterian College in the 2006 NCAA Division II football season as a member of the South Atlantic Conference. They were led by sixth-year head coach Tommy Spangler and played their home games at Bailey Memorial Stadium.

== Schedule ==
Date	Time	Opponent	Site	Result	Attendance	Source
August 26		at West Georgia*	Grisham Stadium; Carrollton, GA	W 10–0		
September 2	1:30 p.m.	Charleston Southern*	Bailey Memorial Stadium; Clinton, SC	L 13–21	4,278	
September 9		at Fayetteville State*	Luther "Nick" Jeralds Stadium; Fayetteville, NC	W 7–6		
September 16	2:00 p.m.	at Elon*	Rhodes Stadium; Elon, NC	L 0–28	9,542	
September 30		Lenoir–Rhyne	Bailey Memorial Stadium; Clinton, SC	W 24–13		
October 7		Wingate	Bailey Memorial Stadium; Clinton, SC	L 9–14		
October 14		at Tusculum	Pioneer Field; Tusculum, TN	W 31–10		
October 21		at Mars Hill	Meares Stadium; Mars Hill, NC	W 21–14		
October 28		Carson–Newman	Bailey Memorial Stadium; Clinton, SC	W 28–7		
November 4		at Catawba	Shuford Stadium; Salisbury, NC	L 14–21		
November 11	1:30 p.m.	Newberry	Bailey Memorial Stadium; Clinton, SC	W 10–0	5,982	
*Non-conference game; Rankings from American Football Coaches Association Poll released prior to the game; All times are in Eastern time
