= 2006 Bryant Bulldogs football team =

American college football season

2006 Bryant Bulldogs football

NE-10 co-champion

NCAA Division II First Round, L 29–31 vs. West Chester
- Conference: Northeast-10 Conference
- Record: 8–3 (7–2 NE-10)
- Head coach: Marty Fine (3rd season)
- Defensive coordinator: Marc Klaiman (3rd season)
- Home stadium: Bulldog Stadium

2006 Northeast-10 Conference football standings
	Conf.			Overall
Team	W		L	W		L
Bryant +^	7	–	2	8	–	3
C. W. Post +	7	–	2	7	–	3
Merrimack +^	7	–	2	8	–	4
Southern Connecticut +^	7	–	2	7	–	4
American International	6	–	3	6	–	4
Bentley	4	–	5	6	–	5
Assumption	4	–	5	4	–	6
Pace	2	–	7	3	–	7
Stonehill	1	–	8	1	–	9
Saint Anselm	0	–	9	0	–	10
+ – Conference co-champions; ^ – NCAA Division II playoff participant

The 2006 Bryant Bulldogs football team represented Bryant University as a member of Northeast-10 Conference (NE-10) during the 2006 NCAA Division II football season. The Bulldogs were led by third-year head coach Marty Fine and played their home games at Bulldog Stadium. They finished the season 8–3 overall and 7–2 in NE-10 play.

== Schedule ==
Date	Opponent	Site	Result	Attendance
September 2	Southern Connecticut	Bulldog Stadium; Smithfield, RI	W 49–20	3,852
September 9	at American International	John Homer Miller Field; Springfield, MA	L 7–20	1,024
September 16	Merrimack	Bulldog Stadium; Smithfield, RI	W 34–7	4,854
September 23	Assumption	Bulldog Stadium; Smithfield, RI	W 45–21	2,142
September 30	at Pace	Finnerty Field; Pleasantville, NY	W 31–17	2,482
October 7	C. W. Post	Bulldog Stadium; Smithfield, RI	L 21–24	3,722
October 14	at Stonehill	Chieftain Stadium; Easton, MA	W 35–14	1,837
October 21	Saint Anselm	Bulldog Stadium; Smithfield, RI	W 41–0	2,845
November 4	at Bentley	Bentley Field; Waltham, MA	W 36–15	1,340
November 11	Becker*	Bulldog Stadium; Smithfield, RI	W 42–0	1,735
November 18	West Chester*	Bulldog Stadium; Smithfield, RI (NCAA Division II First Round)	L 29–31	5,234
*Non-conference game
