= 2006 Abilene Christian Wildcats football team =

American college football season

2006 Abilene Christian Wildcats football

NCAA Division II First Round, L 27–30 ^{OT} vs. West Texas A&M
- Conference: Lone Star Conference
- South Division

Ranking
- AFCA: No. 20
- Record: 8–3 (7–2 LSC)
- Head coach: Chris Thomsen (2nd season)
- Offensive coordinator: Ken Collums (2nd season)
- Offensive scheme: Spread
- Defensive coordinator: Jason Johns (1st season)
- Base defense: 3–4
- Home stadium: Shotwell Stadium

2006 Lone Star Conference football standings
	Conf.			Overall
Team	W		L	W		L
Overall*
No. 10 W. Texas A&M $^	8	–	1	11	–	2
No. 17 Midwestern St. ^	7	–	2	10	–	3
No. 20 Abilene Christian ^	7	–	2	8	–	3
Tarleton State	6	–	3	6	–	4
SE Oklahoma State	5	–	4	6	–	4
Central Oklahoma	4	–	5	5	–	6
SW Oklahoma State	4	–	5	6	–	5
Northeastern State	4	–	5	4	–	6
Texas A&M–Commerce	4	–	5	5	–	5
Texas A&M–Kingsville	2	–	7	3	–	8
East Central	2	–	7	2	–	8
Eastern New Mexico	2	–	7	3	–	7
Angelo State	2	–	7	3	–	7
North Division
SE Oklahoma State x	4	–	1	6	–	4
SW Oklahoma State	3	–	2	6	–	5
Northeastern State	3	–	2	4	–	6
Texas A&M–Commerce	2	–	3	5	–	5
Central Oklahoma	2	–	3	5	–	6
East Central	1	–	4	2	–	8
South Division
No. 10 W. Texas A&M x$^	5	–	1	11	–	2
Tarleton State x	5	–	1	6	–	4
No. 17 Midwestern St. ^	4	–	2	10	–	3
No. 20 Abilene Christian ^	4	–	2	8	–	3
Angelo State	2	–	4	3	–	7
Eastern New Mexico	1	–	5	3	–	7
Texas A&M–Kingsville	0	–	6	3	–	8
$ – Conference champion; ^ – NCAA Division II playoff participant; * – The LSC counted separate overall and division standings.; Rankings from AFCA Poll

The 2006 Abilene Christian Wildcats football team was an American football team that represented Abilene Christian University (ACU) as a member of the South Division of Lone Star Conference (LSC) during the 2006 NCAA Division II football season. In their second season under head coach Chris Thomsen, the Wildcats compiled an overall record of 8–3 record with a mark of 7–2 against conference opponents. Abilene Christian advanced to the NCAA Division II Football Championship playoffs, where the Wildcats lost in the first round to West Texas A&M in overtime, 30–27. The team played its home games at Shotwell Stadium in Abilene, Texas.

== Schedule ==
Date	Time	Opponent	Rank	Site	Result	Attendance
September 7	7:00 p.m.	Central Oklahoma*		Shotwell Stadium; Abilene, TX	W 24–18	6,500
September 16	6:00 p.m.	at No. 10 Southeastern Oklahoma State		Paul Laird Field; Durant, OK	W 51–14	3,635
September 23	6:00 p.m.	Southwestern Oklahoma State		Shotwell Stadium; Abilene, TX	W 31–0	7,000
September 30	6:00 p.m.	at Eastern New Mexico	No. 25	Greyhound Stadium; Portales, NM	W 21–0	2,500
October 7	2:00 p.m.	at Northeastern State	No. 23	Doc Wadley Stadium; Tahlequah, OK	W 45–20	1,500
October 14	2:00 p.m.	Angelo State	No. 21	Shotwell Stadium; Abilene, TX	W 35–7	13,268
October 19	7:00 p.m.	at No. 4 West Texas A&M	No. 20	Buffalo Stadium; Canyon, TX	W 49–33	13,641
October 28	2:00 p.m.	Tarleton State	No. 14	Shotwell Stadium; Abilene, TX	L 36–37	9,000
November 4	7:00 p.m.	at Texas A&M–Kingsville	No. 19	Javelina Stadium; Kinsgville, TX	W 41–38	5,200
November 11	2:00 p.m.	No. 22 Midwestern State	No. 18	Shotwell Stadium; Abilene, TX	L 30–46	9,237
November 18	12:00 p.m.	at No. 9 West Texas A&M*	No. 22	Buffalo Stadium; Canyon, TX (NCAA Division II First Round)	L 27–30 ^{OT}	4,448
*Non-conference game; Rankings from AFCA Poll released prior to the game; All times are in Central time
