= West Chester Golden Rams football =

- First season: 1920; 106 years ago
- Head coach: Duke Greco; 2nd season, 8–11–0 (.421)
- Location: West Chester, Pennsylvania
- Stadium: Farrell Stadium (capacity: 7,500)
- Field: Tomlinson–Fillippo Field
- NCAA division: Division II
- Conference: PSAC
- Colors: Purple and gold
- Bowl record: 4–2–0 (.667)

Conference championships
- 1950, 1952, 1953, 1954, 1956, 1959, 1960, 1961, 1963, 1967, 1969, 1971, 1989*, 1992, 1994, 1999, 2004, 2007, 2018
- Rivalries: Delaware
- Website: wcupagoldenrams.com

The West Chester Golden Rams football team represents West Chester University in NCAA Division II college football. The Golden Rams began playing football in 1920, and compete as members of the Pennsylvania State Athletic Conference (PSAC).

== Conference history ==
- 1951–present: Pennsylvania State Athletic Conference

== Postseason appearances ==
=== NCAA Division II playoffs ===
The Golden Rams have made fourteen appearances in the NCAA Division II playoffs, with a combined record of 10–14.

Year	Round	Opponent	Result
1988	First Round	Jacksonville State	L, 24–63
1989	First Round	Portland State	L, 50–56 (3OT)
1992	First Round	New Haven	L, 26–38
1994	First Round	Ferris State	L, 40–43
2004	First Round; Second Round; Regional Finals; Semifinals	C.W. Post; Shippensburg; East Stroudsburg; Valdosta State	W, 35–3; W, 33–28; W, 48–38; L, 21–45
2005	First Round	C.W. Post	L, 20–24
2006	First Round; Second Round	Bryant; Bloomsburg	W, 31–29; L, 20–21
2007	First Round	Indiana (PA)	L, 35–45
2008	First Round; Second Round	Southern Connecticut; Bloomsburg	W, 52–32; L, 21–28
2013	First Round; Second Round; Regional Finals; Semifinals	American International; Bloomsburg; Shepherd; Lenoir–Rhyne	W, 38–7; W, 40–38; W, 28–7; L, 14–42
2014	First Round; Second Round	Slippery Rock; Concord	W, 46–20; L, 36–51
2017	First Round; Second Round	Shippensburg; Indiana (PA)	W, 27–6; L, 10–44
2018	First Round	New Haven	L, 28–35
2019	First Round	Notre Dame (OH)	L, 24–31

=== Bowl games ===
West Chester has participated in six bowl games, with a combined record of 4–2.

Season	Bowl	Opponent	Result
1947	Burley Bowl	Carson–Newman	W, 20–6
1948	Burley Bowl	Appalachian State	W, 7–2
1951	Pretzel Bowl	Albright	W, 32–9
1962	Cement Bowl	Hofstra	W, 46–12
1966	Tangerine Bowl	Morgan State	L, 6–14
1967	Tangerine Bowl	Tennessee–Martin	L, 8–25
