= Floydada Independent School District =

School district in Texas

Floydada Independent School District is a public school district based in Floydada, Texas, United States. In addition to Floydada, it serves Dougherty.

Since fall 2004, Floydada Junior High School has participated as an "immersion campus" in the Texas Immersion Pilot Project. Floydada ISD was the first of twenty-two immersed campuses to roll out laptops to students in TxTIP. In 2005, the immersion program was extended to Floydada High School with local money. In the 2007-2008 school year, Floydada High School was awarded the Apple Distinguished School Award, the only school in the state of Texas to receive this honor among 17 others nationwide.

== History ==
On July 1, 1987, the Dougherty Independent School District merged into Floydada ISD. On July 1, 1988 another district, South Plains Independent School District, merged into FISD.

In 2009, the school district was rated "recognized" by the Texas Education Agency.

== Schools ==
- Floydada High School (grades 9–12)
- Floydada Junior High (grades 7–8)
- R.C. Andrews Elementary (grades 3–5); closed and combined with A.B. Duncan Elementary in 2009
- A.B. Duncan Elementary (grades PK–6)
