= Scott Parr =

American football coach (born c. 1976)

Current position
- Title: Head coach
- Team: Texas A&M–Kingsville
- Conference: LSC
- Record: 5–6

Biographical details
- Born: c. 1976 (age 49–50); Plainview, Texas, U.S.
- Education: Hardin–Simmons University (1998); Sam Houston State University (2000); Baylor University (2005)

Playing career
- 1994–1996: Hardin–Simmons
- Position: Wide receiver

Coaching career (HC unless noted)
- 1997: Hardin–Simmons (SA)
- 1998–1999: Sam Houston State (RB)
- 2000–2002: Abilene Christian (ST/WR)
- 2003–2004: Baylor (GA)
- 2005: Tarleton State (WR)
- 2006: West Texas A&M (co-OC)
- 2007–2008: West Texas A&M (OC)
- 2008: West Texas A&M (OC/interim QB)
- 2009: West Texas A&M (OC)
- 2010–2013: Texas Tech (OQC)
- 2015–2017: Navarro (OC)
- 2018: Eastern Illinois (OC/QB)
- 2019–2021: Navarro
- 2022–2024: Louisiana Tech (co-OC/TE)
- 2025–present: Texas A&M–Kingsville

Head coaching record
- Overall: 5–6 (college); 14–14 (junior college)
- Bowls: 0–1 (junior college)

Scott Parr (born c. 1976) is an American college football coach. He is the head football coach for Texas A&M University–Kingsville, a position he has held since 2025. He was the head football coach for Navarro College from 2019 to 2021. He also coached for Hardin–Simmons, Sam Houston State, Abilene Christian, Baylor, Tarleton State, West Texas A&M, Texas Tech, Eastern Illinois, and Louisiana Tech. He played college football for Hardin–Simmons as a wide receiver.

== Head coaching record ==
=== College ===
Year	Team	Overall	Conference	Standing	Bowl/playoffs
Texas A&M–Kingsville Javelinas (Lone Star Conference) (2025–present)
2025	Texas A&M–Kingsville	5–6	4–5	T–5th	
Texas A&M–Kingsville:		5–6	4–5		
Total:		5–6			

=== Junior college ===
Year	Team	Overall	Conference	Standing	Bowl/playoffs	NJCAA^{#}
Navarro Bulldogs (Southwest Junior College Football Conference) (2019–2021)
2019	Navarro	6–5	4–4	T–3rd		17
2020–21	Navarro	3–4	3–4	5th		
2021	Navarro	5–5	3–4	T–4th	L Scooter's Coffee Bowl	
Navarro:		14–14	10–12			
Total:		14–14				
