= 2006 NCAA Division II football season =

American college football season

- Regular season: September 2 – November 11, 2006
- Playoffs: November 18 – December 16, 2006
- National Championship: Braly Municipal Stadium; Florence, AL
- Champion: Grand Valley State
- Harlon Hill Trophy: Danny Woodhead, Chadron State

The 2006 NCAA Division II football season, part of college football in the United States organized by the National Collegiate Athletic Association at the Division II level, began on September 2, 2006, and concluded with the NCAA Division II Football Championship on December 16, 2006, at Braly Municipal Stadium in Florence, Alabama, hosted by the University of North Alabama.

Grand Valley State defeated Northwest Missouri State in the championship game, 17–14, to win their fourth Division II national title.

The Harlon Hill Trophy was awarded to Danny Woodhead, running back from Chadron State.

== Conference changes and new programs ==
School	Former conference	New conference
Brevard Tornadoes	New program	Independent
Central Arkansas Bears	Gulf South	Independent (FCS)
Central State Marauders	Independent	GLFC
Central Washington Wildcats	GNAC	NCC
Chowan Hawks	Independent (D-III)	Independent
Dixie State Rebels	Junior college	Independent
Fort Hays State Tigers	RMAC	MIAA
Humboldt State Lumberjacks	GNAC	Independent
Kentucky Wesleyan Panthers	Mid-South (NAIA)	GLFC
Lincoln Blue Tigers	Independent	GLFC
Mary Marauders	DAC (NAIA)	Independent
Missouri–Rolla Miners	Independent	GLFC
Saint Joseph's Pumas	Independent	GLFC
Tiffin Dragons	Independent	GLFC
Upper Iowa Peacocks	Independent	NSIC
West Virginia Tech Golden Bears	WVIAC	Mid-South (NAIA)
Western New Mexico Mustangs	Independent	RMAC
Western Oregon Wolves	GNAC	Independent
Western Washington Vikings	GNAC	NCC
Winston-Salem State Rams	CIAA	Independent (FCS)

Upper Iowa completed their transition to Division II and became eligible for the postseason. West Georgia changed the name of its athletic teams from Braves to Wolves due to NCAA rules regarding Native American mascots.

== Conference standings ==
=== Northeast Region ===
2006 Northeast-10 Conference football standings
	Conf.			Overall
Team	W		L	W		L
Bryant +^	7	–	2	8	–	3
C. W. Post +	7	–	2	7	–	3
Merrimack +^	7	–	2	8	–	4
Southern Connecticut +^	7	–	2	7	–	4
American International	6	–	3	6	–	4
Bentley	4	–	5	6	–	5
Assumption	4	–	5	4	–	6
Pace	2	–	7	3	–	7
Stonehill	1	–	8	1	–	9
Saint Anselm	0	–	9	0	–	10
+ – Conference co-champions; ^ – NCAA Division II playoff participant

2006 Pennsylvania State Athletic Conference football standings
	Conf.			Overall
Team	W		L	W		L
East
No. 4 Bloomsburg x^	6	–	0	12	–	2
No. 24 West Chester ^	5	–	1	9	–	4
East Stroudsburg	4	–	2	7	–	4
Millersville	3	–	3	5	–	6
Kutztown	2	–	4	4	–	6
Cheyney	1	–	5	1	–	10
Mansfield	0	–	6	0	–	10
West
No. 25 IUP x	5	–	1	8	–	2
California (PA) x	5	–	1	8	–	3
Slippery Rock	4	–	2	7	–	4
Edinboro	3	–	3	6	–	5
Shippensburg	3	–	3	5	–	6
Lock Haven	1	–	5	2	–	9
Clarion	0	–	6	1	–	10
x – Division champion/co-champions; ^ – NCAA Division II playoff participant; Rankings from AFCA poll

2006 West Virginia Intercollegiate Athletic Conference football standings
	Conf.			Overall
Team	W		L	W		L
No. 8 Shepherd $^	7	–	0	11	–	1
West Liberty State	4	–	3	7	–	4
Charleston (WV)	4	–	3	5	–	6
Glenville State	4	–	3	5	–	6
Fairmont State	3	–	4	4	–	7
Concord	3	–	4	3	–	8
West Virginia State	2	–	5	5	–	6
West Virginia Wesleyan	1	–	6	2	–	8
$ – Conference champion; ^ – NCAA Division II playoff participant; Rankings from AFCA Poll

=== Southeast Region ===
2006 Central Intercollegiate Athletic Association football standings
	Conf.			Overall
Team	W		L	W		L
Eastern
No. 21 Elizabeth City State xy^	7	–	0	9	–	3
Virginia Union	5	–	2	7	–	3
Bowie State	3	–	4	5	–	5
Shaw	2	–	5	3	–	7
Virginia State	2	–	5	2	–	8
Saint Paul's	1	–	6	2	–	8
Western
No. 9 North Carolina Central xy$^	7	–	0	11	–	1
Johnson C. Smith #	4	–	3	7	–	4
St. Augustine's †	4	–	3	4	–	6
Fayetteville State	2	–	5	3	–	7
Livingstone	1	–	6	1	–	9
Championship: North Carolina Central 17, Elizabeth City State 14
$ – Conference champion; x – Division champion/co-champions; y – Championship game participant; ^ – NCAA Division II playoff participant; # – Pioneer Bowl participant † – St. Augustine's vacated all four wins; Rankings from AFCA Poll

2006 Gulf South Conference football standings
	Conf.			Overall
Team	W		L	W		L
No. 6 North Alabama $^	8	–	0	11	–	1
No. 3 Delta State ^	7	–	1	12	–	3
No. 14 Valdosta State	6	–	2	8	–	2
Henderson State	6	–	2	8	–	3
Arkansas Tech	5	–	3	7	–	3
Harding	5	–	3	6	–	4
West Alabama	3	–	5	6	–	5
Ouachita Baptist	1	–	7	2	–	8
Southern Arkansas	1	–	7	2	–	9
West Georgia	1	–	7	1	–	9
Arkansas–Monticello	1	–	7	1	–	10
$ – Conference champion; ^ – NCAA Division II playoff participant; Rankings from AFCA poll

2006 South Atlantic Conference football standings
	Conf.			Overall
Team	W		L	W		L
No. 12 Newberry $^	6	–	1	11	–	2
Wingate	5	–	2	8	–	3
Presbyterian	5	–	2	7	–	4
Carson–Newman	4	–	3	8	–	3
Catawba	3	–	4	6	–	4
Tusculum	3	–	4	6	–	5
Mars Hill	1	–	6	4	–	7
Lenoir–Rhyne	1	–	6	3	–	8
$ – Conference champion; ^ – NCAA Division II playoff participant; Rankings from AFCA poll

2006 Southern Intercollegiate Athletic Conference football standings
	Conf.			Overall
Team	W		L	W		L
Tuskegee # +	6	–	1	9	–	3
Albany State +^	6	–	1	7	–	4
Lane	5	–	2	8	–	3
Kentucky State	4	–	3	7	–	4
Stillman	4	–	3	5	–	5
Fort Valley State	4	–	3	4	–	7
Clark Atlanta	3	–	4	5	–	5
Benedict	2	–	5	3	–	7
Morehouse	1	–	6	2	–	9
Miles	0	–	7	5	–	5
+ – Conference co-champions; ^ – NCAA Division II playoff participant; # – Pioneer Bowl participant; Rankings from AFCA Poll

2006 NCAA Division II Southeast Region independents football records
	Conf.			Overall
Team	W		L	W		L
North Greenville		–		10	–	2
Brevard #		–		2	–	6
Chowan #		–		0	–	10
# – Provisional Division II member; Rankings from AFCA Poll

=== Northwest Region ===
2006 Great Lakes Intercollegiate Athletic Conference football standings
	Conf.			Overall
Team	W		L	W		L
No. 1 Grand Valley State $^	10	–	0	15	–	0
No. 18 Northwood ^	8	–	2	8	–	3
Ferris State	7	–	3	8	–	3
Michigan Tech	6	–	4	6	–	4
Saginaw Valley State	6	–	4	6	–	4
Wayne State (MI)	6	–	4	6	–	5
Indianapolis	5	–	5	6	–	5
Hillsdale	5	–	5	5	–	6
Ashland	4	–	6	4	–	6
Mercyhurst	3	–	7	3	–	7
Northern Michigan	3	–	7	3	–	7
Findlay	1	–	9	2	–	9
Gannon	1	–	9	1	–	10
$ – Conference champion; ^ – NCAA Division II playoff participant; Rankings from AFCA poll

2006 North Central Conference football standings
	Conf.			Overall
Team	W		L	W		L
No. 7 North Dakota +^	7	–	1	11	–	2
No. 11 Nebraska–Omaha +^	7	–	1	8	–	3
No. 13 South Dakota ^	6	–	2	9	–	4
Minnesota–Duluth	4	–	4	6	–	4
Central Washington	3	–	5	6	–	5
Augustana (SD)	3	–	5	5	–	6
Western Washington	3	–	5	5	–	6
Minnesota State	2	–	6	4	–	7
St. Cloud State	1	–	7	3	–	8
+ – Conference co-champions; ^ – NCAA Division II playoff participant; Rankings from AFCA Poll

2006 Northern Sun Intercollegiate Conference football standings
	Conf.			Overall
Team	W		L	W		L
No. 23 Bemidji State # $	8	–	0	9	–	3
No. 19 Winona State ^	7	–	1	9	–	3
Minnesota State–Moorhead	4	–	4	6	–	5
Concordia–St. Paul	4	–	4	5	–	6
Wayne State (NE)	4	–	4	5	–	6
Northern State	3	–	5	4	–	7
SW Minnesota State	3	–	5	4	–	7
Upper Iowa	3	–	5	3	–	8
Minnesota–Crookston	0	–	8	0	–	11
$ – Conference champion; ^ – NCAA Division II playoff participant; # – Mineral Water Bowl participant; Rankings from AFCA Poll

2006 Great Lakes Football Conference standings
	Conf.			Overall
Team	W		L	W		L
No. 22 Tiffin +	4	–	1	10	–	1
Saint Joseph's (IN) +	4	–	1	8	–	3
Central State (OH) #	2	–	1	2	–	5
Missouri–Rolla	2	–	2	6	–	5
Lincoln (MO)	1	–	3	1	–	8
Kentucky Wesleyan	0	–	5	0	–	11
+ – Conference co-champions; # – Provisional NCAA Division II member; Rankings from AFCA poll

2006 NCAA Division II Northwest Region independents football records
	Conf.			Overall
Team	W		L	W		L
Humboldt State		–		9	–	1
Mary @		–		6	–	4
Western Oregon		–		6	–	4
Dixie State @ #		–		1	–	10
# – Dixie Rotary Bowl participant @ – Provisional Division II member; Rankings from AFCA Poll

=== Southwest Region ===
2006 Lone Star Conference football standings
	Conf.			Overall
Team	W		L	W		L
North Division
SE Oklahoma State	5	–	4	6	–	4
SW Oklahoma State	4	–	5	6	–	5
Texas A&M–Commerce	4	–	5	5	–	5
Central Oklahoma	4	–	5	5	–	6
Northeastern State	4	–	5	4	–	6
East Central	2	–	7	2	–	8
South Division
No. 10 W. Texas A&M $^	8	–	1	11	–	2
No. 17 Midwestern St. ^	7	–	2	10	–	3
No. 20 Abilene Christian ^	7	–	2	8	–	3
Tarleton State	6	–	3	6	–	4
Angelo State	2	–	7	3	–	7
Eastern New Mexico	2	–	7	3	–	7
Texas A&M–Kingsville	2	–	7	3	–	8
$ – Conference champion; ^ – NCAA Division II playoff participant; Rankings from AFCA Poll

2006 Mid-America Intercollegiate Athletics Association football standings
	Conf.			Overall
Team	W		L	W		L
No. 2 NW Missouri State $^	9	–	0	14	–	1
No. 15 Pittsburg State #	7	–	2	10	–	2
No. 16 Missouri Western ^	7	–	2	9	–	3
Washburn	6	–	3	7	–	4
Truman	6	–	3	6	–	5
Central Missouri	3	–	6	5	–	6
Missouri Southern	3	–	6	5	–	6
Emporia State	2	–	7	3	–	8
Fort Hays State	1	–	8	1	–	10
Southwest Baptist	1	–	8	1	–	10
$ – Conference champion; ^ – NCAA Division II playoff participant; # – Mineral Water Bowl participant; Rankings from AFCA poll

2006 Rocky Mountain Athletic Conference football standings
	Conf.			Overall
Team	W		L	W		L
No. 5 Chadron State $^	8	–	0	12	–	1
Fort Lewis #	6	–	2	7	–	4
Nebraska–Kearney	5	–	3	6	–	4
Adams State	4	–	4	6	–	5
New Mexico Highlands	3	–	5	6	–	5
Western New Mexico	3	–	5	5	–	5
Mesa State	3	–	5	4	–	7
Colorado Mines	2	–	6	4	–	7
Western State	2	–	6	3	–	8
$ – Conference champion; ^ – NCAA Division II playoff participant; # – Dixie Rotary Bowl participant; Rankings from AFCA Poll

2006 NCAA Division II Southwest Region independents football records
	Conf.			Overall
Team	W		L	W		L
OK Panhandle State		–		0	–	10
Rankings from AFCA Poll

== Conference summaries ==
Conference Champions

Central Intercollegiate Athletic Association – North Carolina Central
Great Lakes Football Conference – Saint Joseph's (IN)
Great Lakes Intercollegiate Athletic Conference – Grand Valley State
Gulf South Conference – North Alabama
Lone Star Conference – West Texas A&M
Mid-America Intercollegiate Athletic Association – Northwest Missouri State
North Central Conference – Nebraska–Omaha and North Dakota
Northeast-10 Conference – Bryant, C.W. Post, Merrimack, and Southern Connecticut State
Northern Sun Intercollegiate Conference – Bemidji State
Pennsylvania State Athletic Conference – Bloomsburg (East), California (PA) and Indiana (PA) (West)
Rocky Mountain Athletic Conference – Chadron State
South Atlantic Conference – Newberry
Southern Intercollegiate Athletic Conference – Albany State and Tuskegee
West Virginia Intercollegiate Athletic Conference – Shepherd

== Postseason ==
2006 NCAA Division II Football Championship
- Teams: 24
- Finals Site: Braly Municipal Stadium; Florence, AL
- Champion: Grand Valley State; (4th title, title game)
- Runner-up: Northwest Missouri State; (4th title game)
- Semifinalists: Delta State; Bloomsburg
- Winning coach: championship

The 2006 NCAA Division II Football Championship playoffs were the 33rd single-elimination tournament to determine the national champion of men's NCAA Division II college football. The championship game was held at Braly Municipal Stadium in Florence, Alabama for the 19th time.

=== Seeded teams ===
- Bloomsburg
- Chadron State
- Grand Valley State
- Nebraska–Omaha
- North Alabama
- North Carolina Central
- Northwest Missouri State
- Shepherd

=== Playoff bracket ===
First round November 18; Campus Sites	Second round November 25; Campus Sites
1	Grand Valley State*	35
5	South Dakota	17
5	South Dakota	31
4	Northwood*	28
Super Region 3
2	Nebraska–Omaha*	35
3	North Dakota	38
3	North Dakota*	42
6	Winona State	0
1	North Carolina Central*	17
5	Delta State	24
5	Delta State	17
4	Elizabeth City State*	10
Super Region 2
2	North Alabama*	38
3	Newberry	20
3	Newberry*	34
6	Albany State	28
1	Shepherd*	31
4	Merrimack	7
4	Merrimack*	28
5	S. Connecticut	26
Super Region 1
2	Bloomsburg*	21
6	West Chester	20
6	West Chester	31
3	Bryant*	29
1	NW Missouri State*	27
4	Midwestern State	0
4	Midwestern State*	28
5	Missouri Western	26
Super Region 4
2	Chadron State*	43
3	West Texas A&M	17
3	West Texas A&M*†	30
6	Abilene Christian	27

Quarterfinals; December 2 Campus Sites
1	Grand Valley State*	30
3	North Dakota	20
5	Delta State	27
2	North Alabama*	10
1	Shepherd*	21
2	Bloomsburg	24
1	NW Missouri State*	28
2	Chadron State	21

Semifinals; December 9 and 10; Campus Sites
1	Grand Valley State*	49
5	Delta State	30
2	Bloomsburg	3
1	NW Missouri State*	33

National Championship Game; December 16; Braly Municipal Stadium, Florence, Alabama
1	Grand Valley State	17
1	NW Missouri State	14

* Home team † Overtime

== See also ==
- 2006 NCAA Division I FBS football season
- 2006 NCAA Division I FCS football season
- 2006 NCAA Division III football season
- 2006 NAIA football season
