= Colby Carthel =

American football player and coach (born 1976)

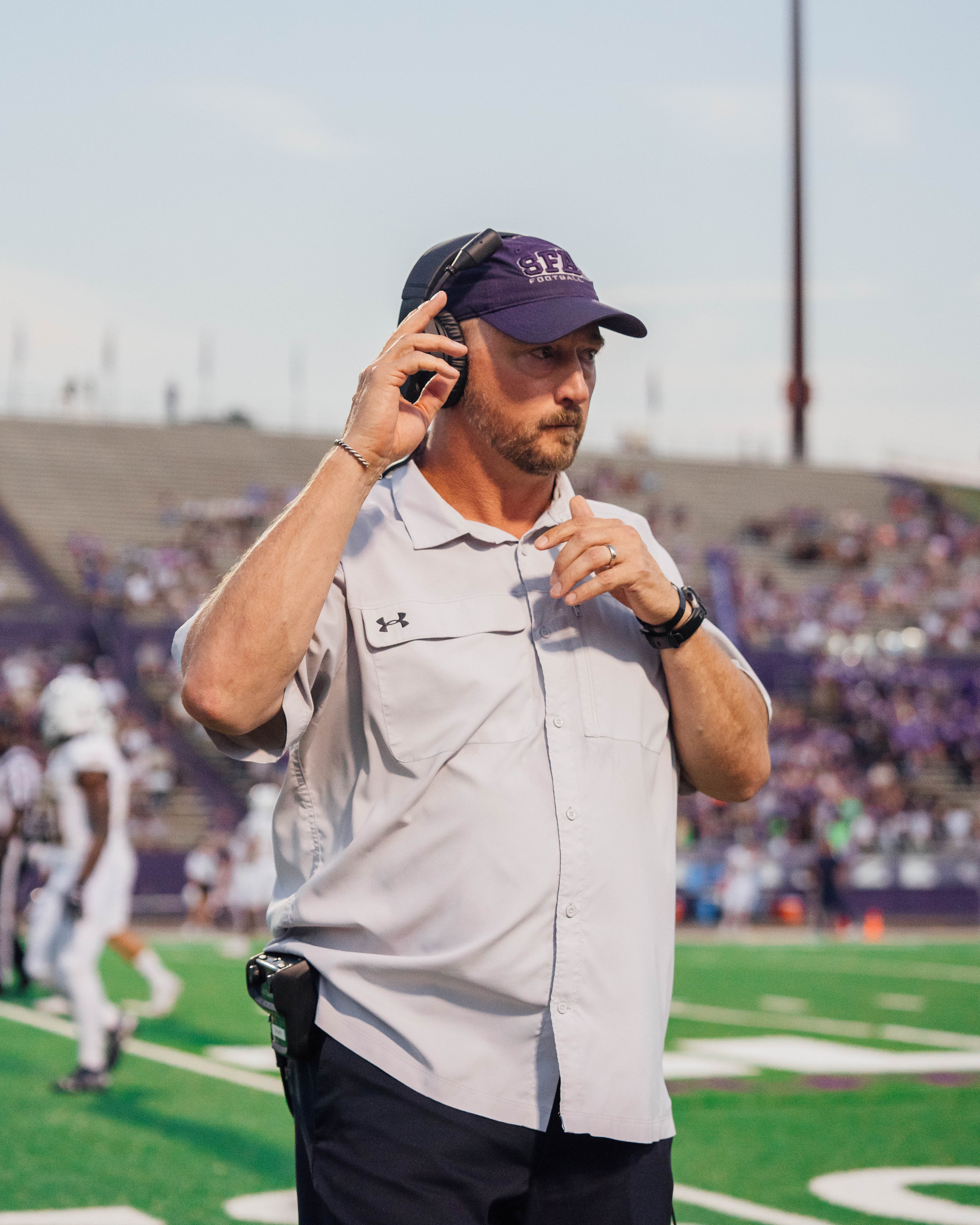
- Carthel in 2023

Current position
- Title: Head coach
- Team: Stephen F. Austin
- Conference: SLC
- Record: 55–39

Biographical details
- Born: August 29, 1976 (age 50); Floydada, Texas, U.S.

Playing career
- 1995–1999: Angelo State
- Position: Linebacker

Coaching career (HC unless noted)
- 2000–2005: Abilene Christian (DL/RC)
- 2006–2012: West Texas A&M (DC)
- 2013–2018: Texas A&M–Commerce
- 2019–present: Stephen F. Austin

Head coaching record
- Overall: 114–57
- Bowls: 1–1
- Tournaments: 7–3 (NCAA D-II playoffs); 1–2 (NCAA D-I playoffs)

Accomplishments and honors

Championships
- 1 NCAA Division II (2017); 3 LSC (2014–2016); 1 WAC (2022); 2 Southland (2025, 2026)

Awards
- LSC Coach of the Year (2018); Southland Conference Coach of the Year (2025)

Colby Don Carthel (born August 29, 1976) is an American college football coach and former player. He is the head football coach at Stephen F. Austin State University in Nacogdoches, Texas, a position he has held since December 2018. Carthel served as the head football coach at Texas A&M University–Commerce from 2013 to 2018, leading the 2017 Texas A&M–Commerce Lions football team to an NCAA Division II Football Championship title. Prior to his time as head coach, he was the defensive coordinator under his father, Don Carthel, at West Texas A&M University, from 2006 to 2012. Carthel played football at Angelo State University, where he was an all-conference linebacker.

== Early life ==
Carthel was born in Floydada, Texas, and was raised in West Texas. He attended Friona High School in Friona, Texas, where he captained the football team and led them to a district championship during the 1994 season. He also went to the State Track & Field Championships for his high school, placing fourth in the discus throw. He graduated from Friona High School in 1995.

== Playing career ==
Carthel played college football at Angelo State University. He started at linebacker for the Rams during his senior season in 1999 and helped lead them to a Lone Star Conference title. He was a four-year letterman and starter for the Angelo State, as well as a three-time Academic All-Conference winner. He graduated in 2000 with a degree in biology.

== Coaching career ==
=== Early career ===
Upon graduation from Angelo State in 2000, Carthel began his coaching career as the defensive line coach and recruiting coordinator at Abilene Christian University, where he remained until 2006. In 2006 his father, Don Carthel, named him the defensive coordinator on his staff at West Texas A&M University.

=== Texas A&M–Commerce ===
In 2013, Carthel was hired as the 19th head football coach at Texas A&M University–Commerce. The program was coming off of two back-to-back 1–9 seasons, the worst two-year stretch in school history. Carthel quickly established a new culture in Commerce that saw 50 of the 85 players leave the program. Carthel and his staff quickly plugged in the missing parts with mainly Junior College transfers and Division I transfers to quickly rebuild the program. Former Auburn University quarterback Tyrik Rollison, who had been considered the best high school quarterback in Texas in the class of 2010, transferred to Texas A&M-Commerce and was one of many JUCO and Division I players from the Dallas/Fort Worth and Northeast Texas area that transferred to A&M-Commerce to play for the Lions.

==== 2013 season ====
Carthel and the Lions started his first season by opening with a home win again Sul Ross State University 51–6. The next week in front of 20,000 LSC fans at AT&T Stadium, Carthel's Lions upset the 22nd ranked Delta State. The next week Carthel the Lions faced off with his former team, West Texas A&M in Canyon, Texas. The Lions stunned the crowd by jumping out to a 14–7 lead, but were bested by a prolific Buffalo team 68–28, and then dropped a 30–24 decision to Midwestern State the next week in Commerce. After a 2–2 start, the Lions rolled out 4 straight wins defeating Southeastern Oklahoma State 31–29, Texas A&M–Kingsville 41–28, McMurry 65–43, and arch-rival Tarleton State 22–20. The Lions rounded out the season by dropping a close loss to Angelo State 25–20, bouncing back against Division I Houston Baptist 55–21, and ending the season with a last second 42–35 loss to Eastern New Mexico. Despite the late season loss, the Lions were invited to the 2013 LiveUnited Texarkana Bowl to finish the season 7–5 overall and fifth in the conference.

==== 2014 season ====
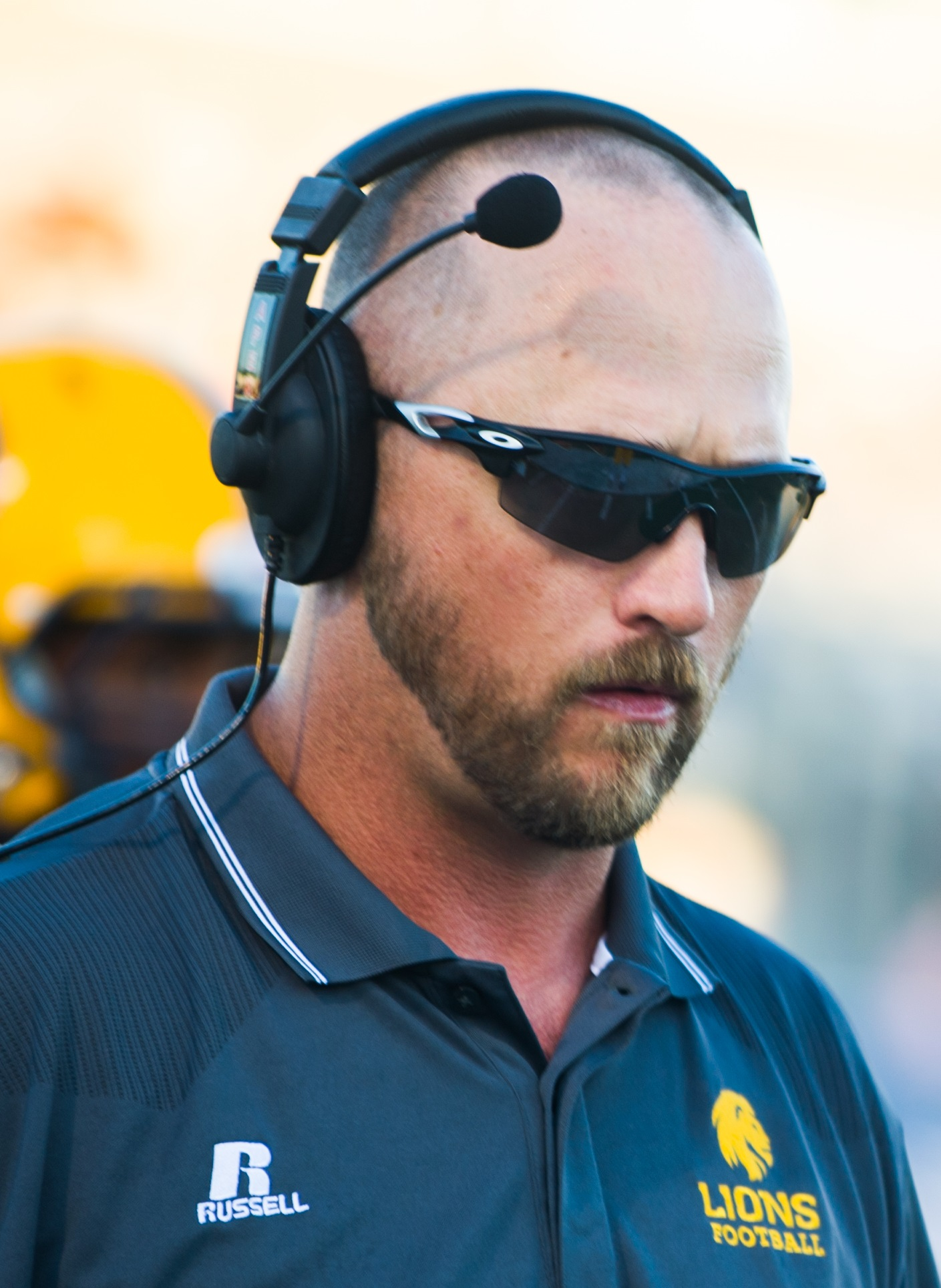
Carthel coaching for the A&M-Commerce Lions in 2014

Carthel's 2014 A&M–Commerce squad led the nation in points per game with an average of 54.1, and yards per game with an average of 535.4. They opened the season with a record-breaking performance against East Texas Baptist in which they scored 98 points and amassed 986 total yards of offense and 13 touchdowns. The win gained the Lions national exposure as it was reported on ESPN's SportsCenter that same night. The next day, head coach Colby Carthel was interviewed by ESPN's Linda Cohn in regards to the win. In that win the Lions set national and conference records for points scored, yards gained, and total offense in a game. The Lions also defeated A&M-Kingsville, Tarleton State, West Texas A&M, Angelo State, and Tarleton State a second time in the conference playoffs. The lone losses were to the Division I Stephen F. Austin, Midwestern State, and to Angelo State in a conference finals rematch. The Lions won the Lone Star Conference championship for the 21st time in school history, the first time since the 1990 season. The Lions were left out of the NCAA Division II playoffs, but were invited back to the postseason, which resulted in a 72–21 win over East Central in the C.H.A.M.P.S. Heart of Texas Bowl, the win was the first postseason win for the program since a 1991 win over Grand Valley State in the 1991 NCAA Division II first round of the playoffs to finish the season 9–3. The 2014 team saw Ricky Collins, Vernon Johnson, and Charles Tuaau leave to the NFL.

==== 2015 season ====
Prior to the start of the 2015 season the Lions were picked second to finish behind Angelo State. The Lions started out with a win against Adams State followed by a loss to a top ten Delta State team in a last second thriller. Carthel then guided the Lions to their second straight conference championship with an undefeated conference record, and qualified for the NCAA Division II playoffs for the first time since 1995, where they lost to Ferris State in the first round of the playoffs, finishing 8–4 overall ranked No. 20 in the nation. The Lions were guided by former University of Nevada QB Harrison Stewart, RB Richard Cooper, WR Lance Evans, and defensive standouts Toni Pulu and Cole Pitts. Stewart threw for over 3,300 yards, putting him second all-time for single season passing yards in Lion football history, while Cooper was an All-American and Evans, Pulu, and Pitts were all first team All-LSC Conference. The Lions led the conference in passing offense and total offense.

==== 2016 season ====
In the spring of 2016, Carthel was rewarded with a contract extension with options that would keep him at A&M–Commerce until 2018. In his first three seasons as head coach he led the team to a total of three postseason appearances, two LSC championships, and seven or more wins in each season. He also helped lead a number of players to the NFL.

Carthel's Lions started the season ranked No. 9 in the nation and picked to win the Lone Star Conference for the third straight year. Richard Cooper, an All-American running back, returned for his senior season and was picked as a preseason conference back of the year. The Lions ran out to a 5–0 record to start the season, but lost by one point to Midwestern State in a back and forth affair in Commerce. The Lions then reeled off 5 straight wins and clinched their third straight LSC Championship after Midwestern lost to Eastern New Mexico in the final game of the season. The Lions once again were selected for the NCAA Division II playoffs and hosted a first-round game for the first time since 1991. The Lions defeated No. 24 Colorado Mesa, setting them up with No. 2 Grand Valley State. The Lions bowed out in the second round to the Lakers, ending their season at 11–2. Lions quarterback Luis Perez was selected as a Harlon Hill Trophy nominee, while punter Hector Dominguez was first team All-American and offensive lineman Jared Machorro was named second team All-American. Return specialist Shawn Hooks and linebacker Uriah Harris were both named All-Region team and the Lions placed 8 members on the All-Lone Star Conference first team, including Cooper, Perez, Hooks, Harris, Dominguez, Machorro, defensive lineman Tavita Faaiu, and wideout Lance Evans. The Lions 11–2 season was the most wins for the Lions since 1953 and the first time the Lions had double digit wins since 1990. In December 2016, TAMUC President Dr. Ray Keck and Athletic Director Tim McMurray announced they were extending Carthel's contract yet again, this time until 2020.

==== 2017 season ====
Carthel's Lions were picked to win a fourth straight Lone Star Conference title by the league's coaches and media. Luis Perez, All-American quarterback returned for his senior season along with Jared Machoroo, who was a pre-season All-American. The Lions started their season 4–0, reaching No. 2 in the polls before losing to Midwestern State in a close 47–42 affair. The Lions finished the season 9–1, second in the Lone Star Conference behind Midwestern State. The Lions qualified for the NCAA Division II playoffs for the third straight season. In the first round, the Lions traveled to Winona State and defeated the Warriors 20–6. In the second round, the Lions defeated Central Washington in come from behind fashion in double overtime, 34–31. In the Super Region 4 championship game, the Lions defeated Minnesota State-Mankato 31–21. The Lions then hosted Harding at Memorial Stadium in Commerce, Texas, in the national semifinals, the first time the Lions had played in the national semifinals since being in the NAIA during the 1980 season. The Lions defeated the Bison 31–17 to earn a spot in the national championship game against West Florida. The Lions defeated the Argonauts 37–27 to win their first national championship since 1972 and their first since as a member of the NCAA. Lions quarterback Luis Perez won the Harlon Hill Trophy, and the Lions finished the season ranked a consensus No. 1 in the country.

==== 2018 season ====
Carthel's Lions were selected as a preseason national No. 1 team and also picked to win the Lone Star Conference. The season started with a televised overtime thriller by beating rival Texas A&M-Kingsville for the seventh straight season, something no other Lion coach had ever done. The Lions then defeated William Jewell 27–17 and Lone Star Conference foe Eastern New Mexico 21–11. The Lions then lost their first game of the season to No. 22 CSU Pueblo 23–13. The Loss to CSU Pueblo was only the second time in the Carthel era that the Lions were held without an offensive touchdown. The Lions made personnel changes on offense and rebounded to soundly defeat Lock Haven 68–6, and then avenged their only loss of the previous season by beating Midwestern State 20–19. The MSU game was played in odd circumstances as the Lions and Mustangs played to a 10–10 tie in the first half in Wichita Falls, Texas, but could not continue due to inclement weather. The schools mutually agreed to continue the second half of the game at Apogee Stadium on the campus of North Texas in Denton, that following afternoon. After defeating MSU, the Lions lost for the first time in 5 years to A&M System rival Tarleton State 47–21. Again, the Lions rebounded by routing Western New Mexico 55–7 and defeating another cross state rival, West Texas A&M, 41–16. The Lions finished the season with a close win against Texas-Permian Basin 20–17 and clinched a spot in the NCAA Division II playoffs for the fourth straight season with a 41–13 win over Angelo State. The Lions finished the regular season with a 9–2 record, a No. 15 national ranking, LSC runner-ups, and Carthel was named Lone Star Conference Coach of The Year. They then defeated an undefeated and top 5 ranked Minnesota-Duluth team 33–17 in the first round of the NCAA Division II playoffs, before bowing out in a second round rematch against conference foe Tarleton State 34–28 to end the year at 10–3.

=== Stephen F. Austin ===
On December 2, 2018, Carthel was named the head football coach at Stephen F. Austin State University.

==== 2019 season ====
Carthel inherited a program that received a post-season ban because the previous regime's failure to meet APR standards. With the ban Stephen F. Austin also had to forfeit any wins from the 2013 season to the 2019 season. Several upperclassmen student-athletes were academically suspended for the entire season and 43 different freshmen saw meaningful snaps during the 2019 season.

==== 2020 season ====
During the Covid season, the football season was condensed to ten games. Four being FBS opponents of UTEP, UTSA, SMU and Memphis. With the limited amount of FCS opponents playing during the 2020 fall semester, only teams available to play were Abilene Christian and Eastern Kentucky. The game between Abilene Christian and Stephen F. Austin was for the 2020 fall Southland Conference championship. This was Carthel's first major win at Stephen F. Austin. He would finish the season with a 6–4 record.

==== 2021 season ====
In Coach Carthel's third year, the Lumberjacks showed continued improvement. Several All-Conference caliber players including Xavier Gipson, B.J. Thompson, Trae Self, Rayshad Nichols, TKai Lloyd, Myles Heard and many others helped lead Stephen F. Austin to an 8–3 regular season record and giving the Lumberjacks their first playoff appearance since 2014.

==== 2022 season ====
After the departure of defensive coordinator, Scott Power. Carthel had to revamp the defensive coaching staff as well as add several talented student-athletes on the defensive side of the ball. Carthel was able to build the Lumberjacks to win a share of the 2022 WAC conference title.

2023 season

In 2023, under Head Coach Colby Carthel, the Lumberjacks entered its first season in the United Athletic Conference. SFA football finished 3-8 overall, earning wins over Alcorn State, Northwestern State, and Texas A&M-Commerce.

2024 season

In the 2024 season, Carthel led the Lumberjacks to a 7-5 record overall, marking SFA's return to the Southland Conference. The defense ranked second in the Southland Conference, forcing 28 turnovers, the sixth-most in the FCS. The Jacks went 5-1 at home, producing eight All-Southland honors, including Southland Newcomer of the Year Sam Vidlak.

2025 season

In 2025, Head Coach Colby Carthel led the Lumberjacks through one of the most successful seasons in SFA football history. Finishing 11-3 overall and 8-0 in the Southland Conference play to claim the program's first Southland Conference championship since 2010. The first time in Stephen F Austin history to be undefeated in Conference play. SFA earned its ninth FCS Playoff appearance, advanced to the FCS Quarterfinals, and finished the season ranked seventh nationally. Being the program's highest final ranking since 1995. Carthel was named Southland Conference Coach of the Year and recorded his 100th career coaching victory. The Lumberjacks produced sixteen All-Southland selections and nine All-Americans, including Southland Offensive Player of the year, Sam Vidlak, and Offensive Player of the Year, Erik Gray. The 2025 season established SFA as a nationally recognized FCS program and marked a defining moment in the continued growth of Lumberjack Football under Carthel's leadership.

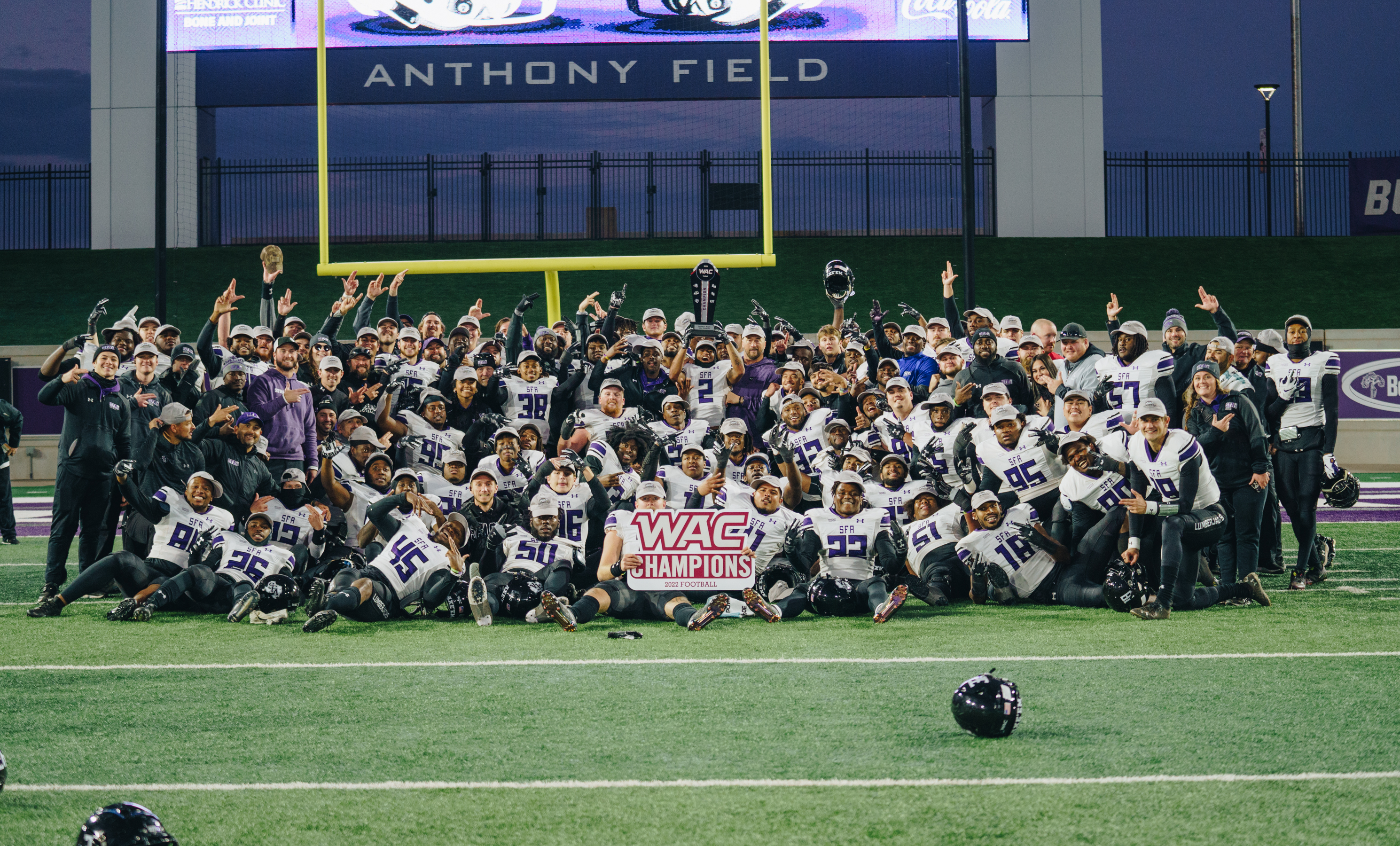
Stephen F. Austin would defeat Abilene Christian in the final regular season game to become the WAC co-conference champions

== Personal life ==
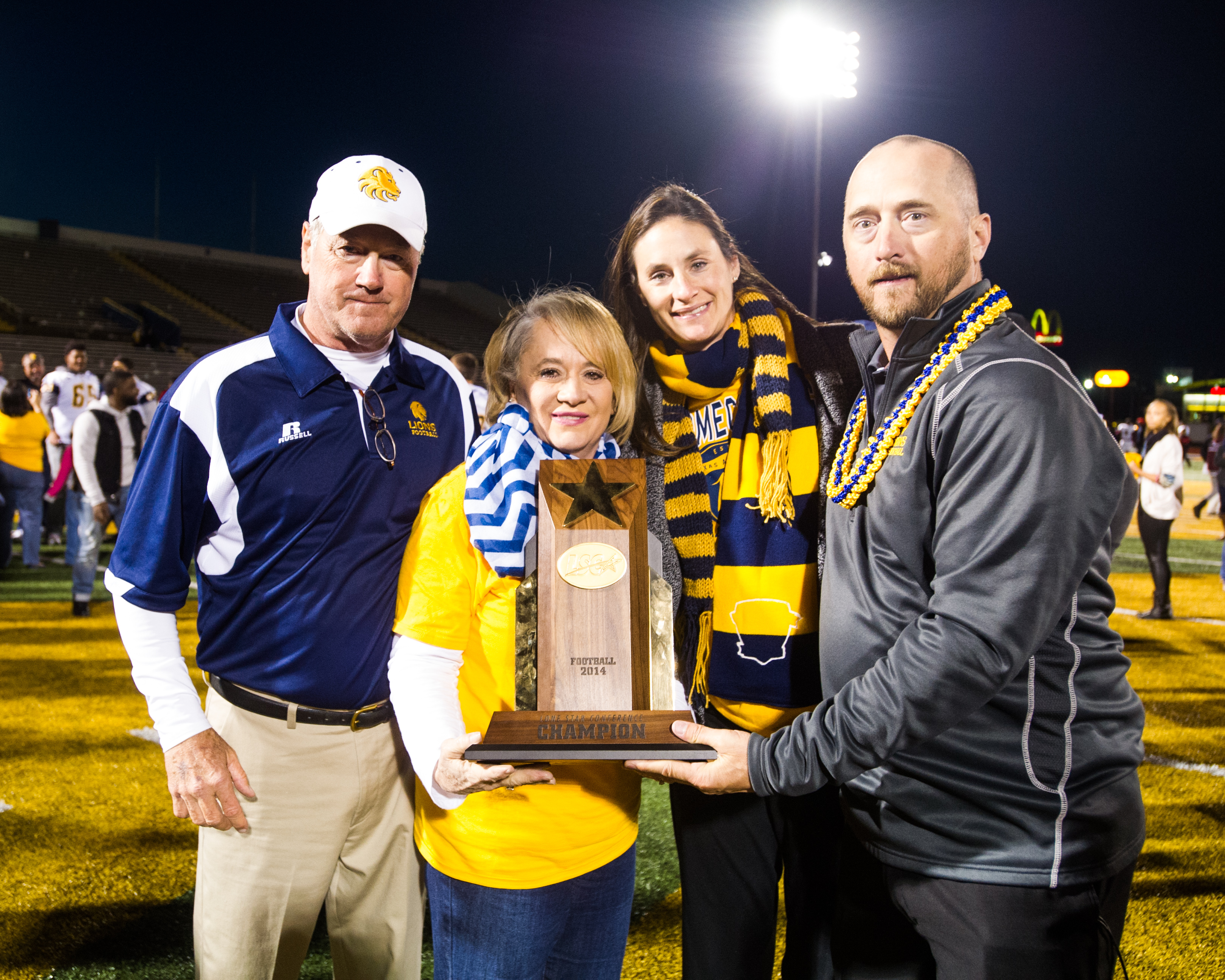
Carthel with his father (Don), mother (Cindy) and wife (Sarah) celebrating his first LSC Title as a head coach

Carthel is married to Sarah Carthel (née Butler), a former All-American volleyball player and accomplished collegiate coach volleyball coach. Sarah was a standout player at West Texas A&M University, earning NCAA Division II Player of the Year honors twice before beginning her coaching career. Upon her husband's move to Commerce, she resigned her position at WT and became assistant head coach for the A&M–Commerce volleyball program. The Carthel's have 3 sons: Major (11), Bear (8), and Stone (7). They reside in Nacogdoches, Tx where Carthel serves as the Head football coach Stephen F. Austin.

== Head coaching record ==
| Year | Team | Overall | Conference | Standing | Bowl/playoffs | AFCA/STATS^{#} | Coaches^{°} |
|---|---|---|---|---|---|---|---|
Texas A&M–Commerce (Lone Star Conference) (2013–2018)
| 2013 | Texas A&M–Commerce | 7–5 | 2–4 | 5th | L Live United Texarkana Bowl | | |
| 2014 | Texas A&M–Commerce | 9–3 | 6–1 | 1st | W C.H.A.M.P.S. Heart of Texas Bowl | | |
| 2015 | Texas A&M–Commerce | 8–4 | 6–0 | 1st | L NCAA Division II First Round | 23 | |
| 2016 | Texas A&M–Commerce | 11–2 | 7–1 | 1st | L NCAA Division II Second Round | 9 | |
| 2017 | Texas A&M–Commerce | 14–1 | 7–1 | 2nd | W NCAA Division II National Championship | 1 | |
| 2018 | Texas A&M–Commerce | 10–3 | 7–1 | 2nd | L NCAA Division II Second Round | 9 | |
| Texas A&M–Commerce: | | 59–18 | 35–8 | | | | |
Stephen F. Austin Lumberjacks (Southland Conference) (2019–2020)
| 2019 | Stephen F. Austin | 3–9 | 3–6 | T–8th | | | |
| 2020–21 | Stephen F. Austin | 6–4 | 0–0 | N/A | | | |
Stephen F. Austin Lumberjacks (Western Athletic Conference) (2021–2022)
| 2021 | Stephen F. Austin | 8–4 | 4–2 | 2nd | L NCAA Division I First Round | 21 | 18 |
| 2022 | Stephen F. Austin | 6–5 | 3–1 | T–1st | | | |
Stephen F. Austin Lumberjacks (United Athletic Conference) (2023)
| 2023 | Stephen F. Austin | 3–8 | 0–6 | 9th | | | |
Stephen F. Austin Lumberjacks (Southland Conference) (2024–present)
| 2024 | Stephen F. Austin | 7–5 | 4–3 | T–3rd | | | |
| 2025 | Stephen F. Austin | 11–3 | 8–0 | 1st | L NCAA Division I Quarterfinal | 7 | 7 |
| 2026 | Stephen F. Austin | 11–1 | 8–1 | T–1st | | | |
| Stephen F. Austin: | | 55–39 | 30–19 | | | | |
| Total: | | 114–57 | | | | | |
National championship Conference title Conference division title or championship game berth
