= Floydada, Texas =

- City
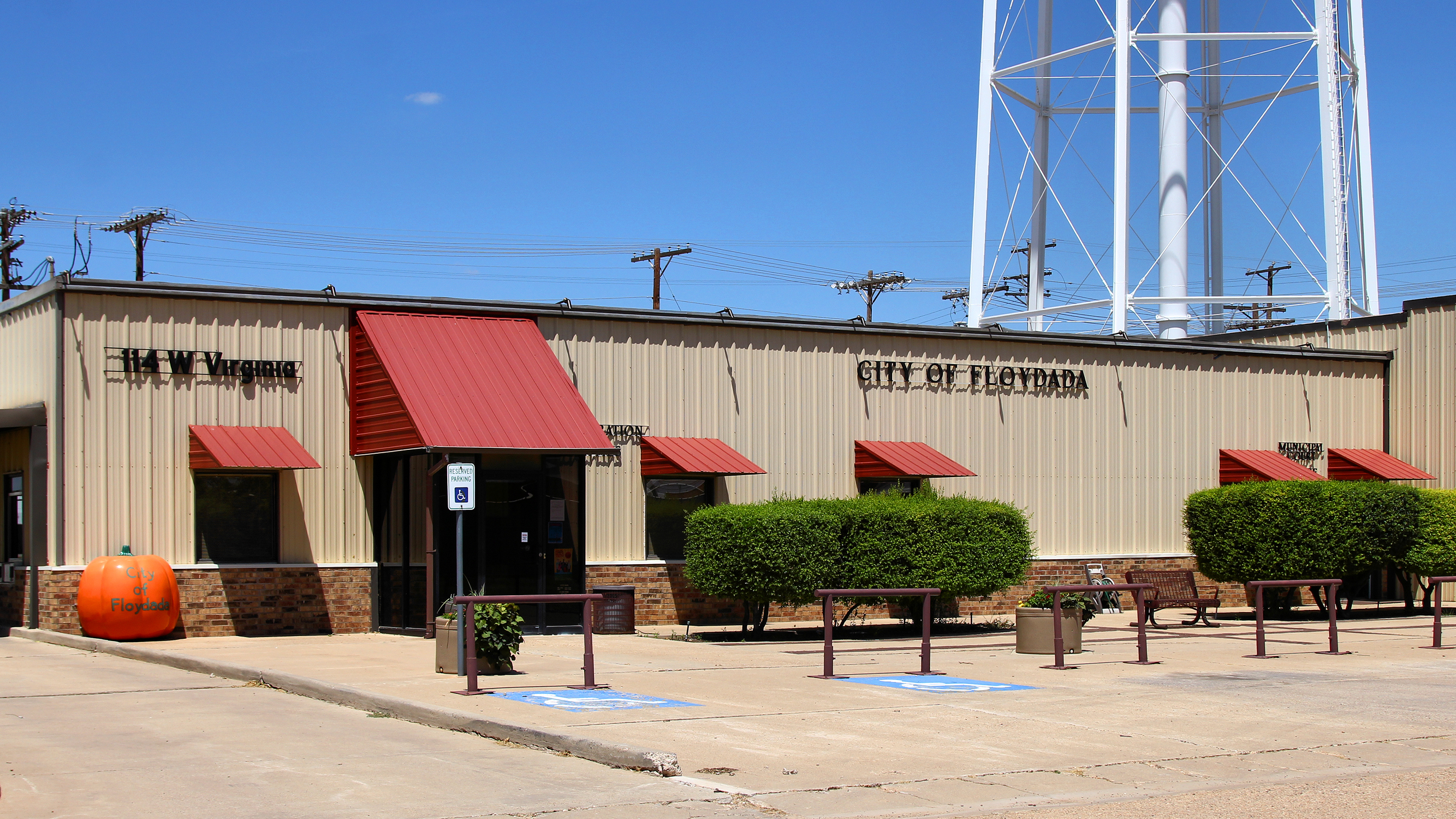
- Floydada City Hall
- Nicknames: Pumpkin Capital of the USA, Pumpkin Capital USA
- Location within Texas Location within the United States
- Coordinates: 33°59′01″N 101°20′12″W
- Country: United States
- State: Texas
- County: Floyd
- Region: Llano Estacado
- Platted: 1890

Area
  - Total: 2.03 sq mi (5.27 km^{2})
  - Land: 2.03 sq mi (5.27 km^{2})
  - Water: 0 sq mi (0.00 km^{2})
- Elevation: 3,183 ft (970 m)

Population (2020)
  - Total: 2,675
  - Density: 1,310/sq mi (508/km^{2})
- Time zone: UTC−6 (CST)
  - Summer (DST): UTC-5 (CDT)
- ZIP code: 79235
- Area code: 806
- FIPS code: 48-26268
- GNIS feature ID: 2410514
- Website: www.cityoffloydada.com

Floydada (/flɔɪˈdeɪdə/ floy-DAY-də) is a city in and the county seat of Floyd County, Texas, United States. This rural community lies on the High Plains of the Llano Estacado in West Texas and is sometimes referred to as the Pumpkin Capital of Texas. Its population was 2,675 at the 2020 census, down from 3,038 at the 2010 census and 3,676 at the 2000 census.

== History ==
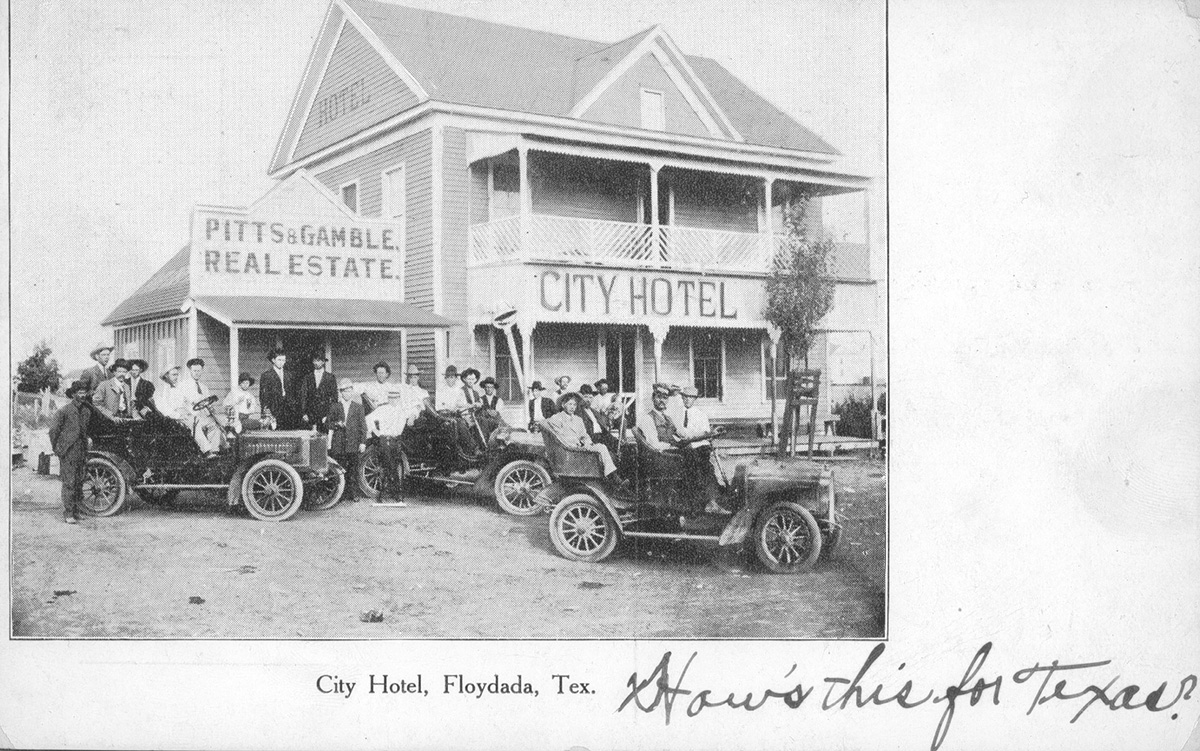
Postcard of City Hotel in Floydada, unknown date

According to the Texas State Historical Association, the community of Floydada was originally named "Floyd City". It was established in 1890 on 640 acres (260 ha) of land donated by James B. and Caroline Price of Jefferson City, Missouri. Floydada won the election as county seat over Della Plain. When a post office opened, the name was changed to "Floydada". The meaning of the name is disputed. Some claim it was meant to be "Floydalia" but was garbled in transmission to the U.S. Postal Service, while others insist it is a combination of the county's name and that of James Price's mother, Ada. A third view is that it was formed from Caroline Price's parents, Floyd and Ada.

Floydada became an important railroad junction in 1928, when the Quanah, Acme and Pacific Railway reached the town.

== Geography ==
Floydada is located southwest of the center of Floyd County. U.S. Route 62 enters from the southwest as Ralls Highway and leads east out of town as Houston Street, while U.S. Route 70 enters from the north as Second Street and joins US 62 to exit town on Houston Street. Via US 62, Lubbock is 51 miles (82 km) southwest, while US 70 leads northwest 27 miles (43 km) to Plainview. The two highways run east together 31 miles (50 km) to Matador. Texas State Highway 207 leads north from Floydada 35 miles (56 km) to Silverton.

According to the United States Census Bureau, Floydada has a total area of 2.0 square miles (5.3 km^{2}), all of it land.

Floydada lies on the High Plains of the Llano Estacado around 18 miles (29 km) west of the Caprock Escarpment. Blanco Canyon, a scenic canyon carved by the White River, is 6 miles (10 km) to the south. The terrain surrounding Floydada consists of level plains that at one time were covered with grassland vegetation and populated with bison. The bison were extirpated, and with the exception of Blanco Canyon, the shortgrass prairie has been replaced by plowed cropland, where cotton, grain sorghum, wheat, and pumpkins are grown.

== Climate ==
The city of Floydada experiences winters that are cool and windy with little or no precipitation except snowfall. Summers are less windy with moderately high temperatures.

Category	Summer	Winter
Average high temperature	92F	50F
Average low temperature	68F	25F
Average precipitation	3.75in	0.5in
Average morning humidity	75%	70%
Average afternoon humidity	50%	50%
Average wind speed	11.5 mph	14.5 mph
Average snowfall	0.0in	5.0in
Average sunshine	78%	65%

Climate data for Floydada, Texas (1991–2020 normals, extremes 1939–present)
Month	Jan	Feb	Mar	Apr	May	Jun	Jul	Aug	Sep	Oct	Nov	Dec	Year
Record high °F (°C)	81 (27)	91 (33)	94 (34)	100 (38)	109 (43)	111 (44)	109 (43)	109 (43)	103 (39)	100 (38)	89 (32)	85 (29)	111 (44)
Mean maximum °F (°C)	73.3 (22.9)	77.9 (25.5)	85.6 (29.8)	90.2 (32.3)	96.8 (36.0)	100.9 (38.3)	100.7 (38.2)	99.1 (37.3)	95.4 (35.2)	90.0 (32.2)	80.2 (26.8)	72.7 (22.6)	103.5 (39.7)
Mean daily maximum °F (°C)	52.1 (11.2)	56.6 (13.7)	65.2 (18.4)	73.4 (23.0)	81.5 (27.5)	89.5 (31.9)	92.4 (33.6)	91.2 (32.9)	83.5 (28.6)	73.9 (23.3)	61.8 (16.6)	52.9 (11.6)	72.8 (22.7)
Daily mean °F (°C)	38.7 (3.7)	42.4 (5.8)	50.4 (10.2)	58.5 (14.7)	67.8 (19.9)	76.7 (24.8)	80.2 (26.8)	78.9 (26.1)	71.3 (21.8)	60.5 (15.8)	48.3 (9.1)	39.9 (4.4)	59.5 (15.3)
Mean daily minimum °F (°C)	25.3 (−3.7)	28.2 (−2.1)	35.6 (2.0)	43.5 (6.4)	54.2 (12.3)	63.8 (17.7)	67.9 (19.9)	66.5 (19.2)	59.0 (15.0)	47.1 (8.4)	34.9 (1.6)	26.8 (−2.9)	46.1 (7.8)
Mean minimum °F (°C)	11.7 (−11.3)	14.6 (−9.7)	20.1 (−6.6)	29.2 (−1.6)	40.5 (4.7)	54.7 (12.6)	60.9 (16.1)	59.4 (15.2)	47.0 (8.3)	31.5 (−0.3)	19.4 (−7.0)	12.8 (−10.7)	7.3 (−13.7)
Record low °F (°C)	−9 (−23)	−7 (−22)	3 (−16)	18 (−8)	27 (−3)	42 (6)	46 (8)	48 (9)	34 (1)	16 (−9)	2 (−17)	−3 (−19)	−9 (−23)
Average precipitation inches (mm)	0.71 (18)	0.69 (18)	1.33 (34)	1.47 (37)	3.11 (79)	3.41 (87)	1.82 (46)	1.98 (50)	2.62 (67)	1.45 (37)	0.75 (19)	0.85 (22)	20.19 (513)
Average snowfall inches (cm)	0.9 (2.3)	1.2 (3.0)	0.5 (1.3)	0.1 (0.25)	0.0 (0.0)	0.0 (0.0)	0.0 (0.0)	0.0 (0.0)	0.0 (0.0)	0.1 (0.25)	0.7 (1.8)	0.9 (2.3)	4.4 (11)
Average precipitation days (≥ 0.01 in)	2.1	2.5	3.4	3.5	5.5	6.3	4.5	4.9	4.9	3.7	2.5	2.4	46.2
Average snowy days (≥ 0.1 in)	0.8	0.8	0.3	0.1	0.0	0.0	0.0	0.0	0.0	0.1	0.4	0.7	3.2
Source: NOAA

== Demographics ==
Historical population
Census	Pop.	Note	%±
1910	664		—
1920	1,384		108.4%
1930	2,637		90.5%
1940	2,726		3.4%
1950	3,210		17.8%
1960	3,769		17.4%
1970	4,109		9.0%
1980	4,193		2.0%
1990	3,896		−7.1%
2000	3,676		−5.6%
2010	3,038		−17.4%
2020	2,675		−11.9%
U.S. Decennial Census

=== 2020 census ===
Racial composition as of the 2020 census
Race	Number	Percent
White	1,434	53.6%
Black or African American	87	3.3%
American Indian and Alaska Native	14	0.5%
Asian	6	0.2%
Native Hawaiian and Other Pacific Islander	0	0.0%
Some other race	409	15.3%
Two or more races	725	27.1%
Hispanic or Latino (of any race)	1,751	65.5%

As of the 2020 census, Floydada had a population of 2,675, 1,052 households, and 789 families residing in the city.

The median age was 37.5 years; 29.2% of residents were under the age of 18 and 18.0% of residents were 65 years of age or older. For every 100 females there were 95.7 males, and for every 100 females age 18 and over there were 90.7 males age 18 and over.

0.0% of residents lived in urban areas, while 100.0% lived in rural areas.

There were 1,052 households in Floydada, of which 35.6% had children under the age of 18 living in them. Of all households, 47.1% were married-couple households, 18.1% were households with a male householder and no spouse or partner present, and 29.0% were households with a female householder and no spouse or partner present. About 27.6% of all households were made up of individuals and 12.1% had someone living alone who was 65 years of age or older.

There were 1,267 housing units, of which 17.0% were vacant. The homeowner vacancy rate was 0.7% and the rental vacancy rate was 15.8%.

=== 2000 census ===
As of the 2000 census, 3,676 people, 1,304 households, and 980 families lived in the city. The population density was 1,811 inhabitants per square mile (699/km^{2}). The 1,507 housing units had an average density of 742/sq mi (287/km^{2}). The racial makeup of the city was 70.35% White, 4.13% African American, 1.09% Native American, 0.14% Asian, 22.20% from other races, and 2.09% from two or more races. Hispanics or Latinos of any race were 51.63% of the population.

Of the 1,304 households, 38.7% had children under 18 living with them, 58.8% were married couples living together, 12.7% had a female householder with no husband present, and 24.8% were not families. About 23.5% of all households were made up of individuals, and 13.8% had someone living alone who was 65 or older. The average household size was 2.74 and the average family size was 3.24.

In the city, the age distribution was 31.6% under 18, 7.8% from 18 to 24, 23.6% from 25 to 44, 20.6% from 45 to 64, and 16.5% who were 65 or older. The median age was 34 years. For every 100 females, there were 91.4 males. For every 100 females 18 and over, there were 84.6 males.

The median income for a household in the city was $25,429 and for a family was $30,038. Males had a median income of $25,179 versus $17,381 for females. The per capita income for the city was $12,431. About 24.7% of families and 26.5% of the population were below the poverty line, including 36.2% of those under 18 and 19.7% of those 65 or over.

== Education ==
The city is served by the Floydada Independent School District. Apple Inc. has teamed up with Floydada to distribute laptop computers to the students and staff of Floydada's junior high and high schools. In 2007–2008, Floydada was the only town in Texas to be an Apple distinguished school.

Floyd County is in the service area of South Plains College.

== Workforce development ==
Floydada has a number of free training programs provided by the Floydada Professional Development Center and the Floydada Economic Development Corporation (EDC). Employers can access financial assistance for training through the Skills Development Fund and the Self-Sufficiency Fund administered by the Texas Workforce Commission. Local training facilities include Caprock Community Action and the Floydada Technology Center.

The Floydada Technology Center began in 2003 and is provided by the Floydada EDC and is housed in the EDC offices at 105 South 5th Street. The center itself was designed to provide workforce development to both citizens and businesses upon request. It houses a 12-student classroom with an instructor's podium and computer attached to a projector. Caprock Community Action was opened in 2002 and operates a learning laboratory that offers citizens the opportunity to earn their general equivalency diploma. They are located at 701 E. Lee Street.

== Coronado site ==
Archaeologists from Wichita State University excavated in Blanco Canyon, 6 miles (10 km) south of Floydada, and discovered significant evidence that Spanish explorer Francisco Vázquez de Coronado established a major camp there during his search for Quivira, one of the legendary Seven Cities of Gold. The Floyd County Historical Museum in downtown Floydada displays some of the significant artifacts from Coronado's campsite. Also, an historical marker in Blanco Canyon tells of Coronado's expedition, which led through the canyon.

== Wind energy development ==
Floydada is located in what many call the wind corridor of the United States, which stretches through the Great Plains from the Texas Panhandle north into Minnesota, including some of the most wind-rich states in the country.

The region is ideal for wind development because of its wind quality, the potential to connect into two different electric grid systems, and the plan scheduled for transmission build-out in the area.

== Economy ==
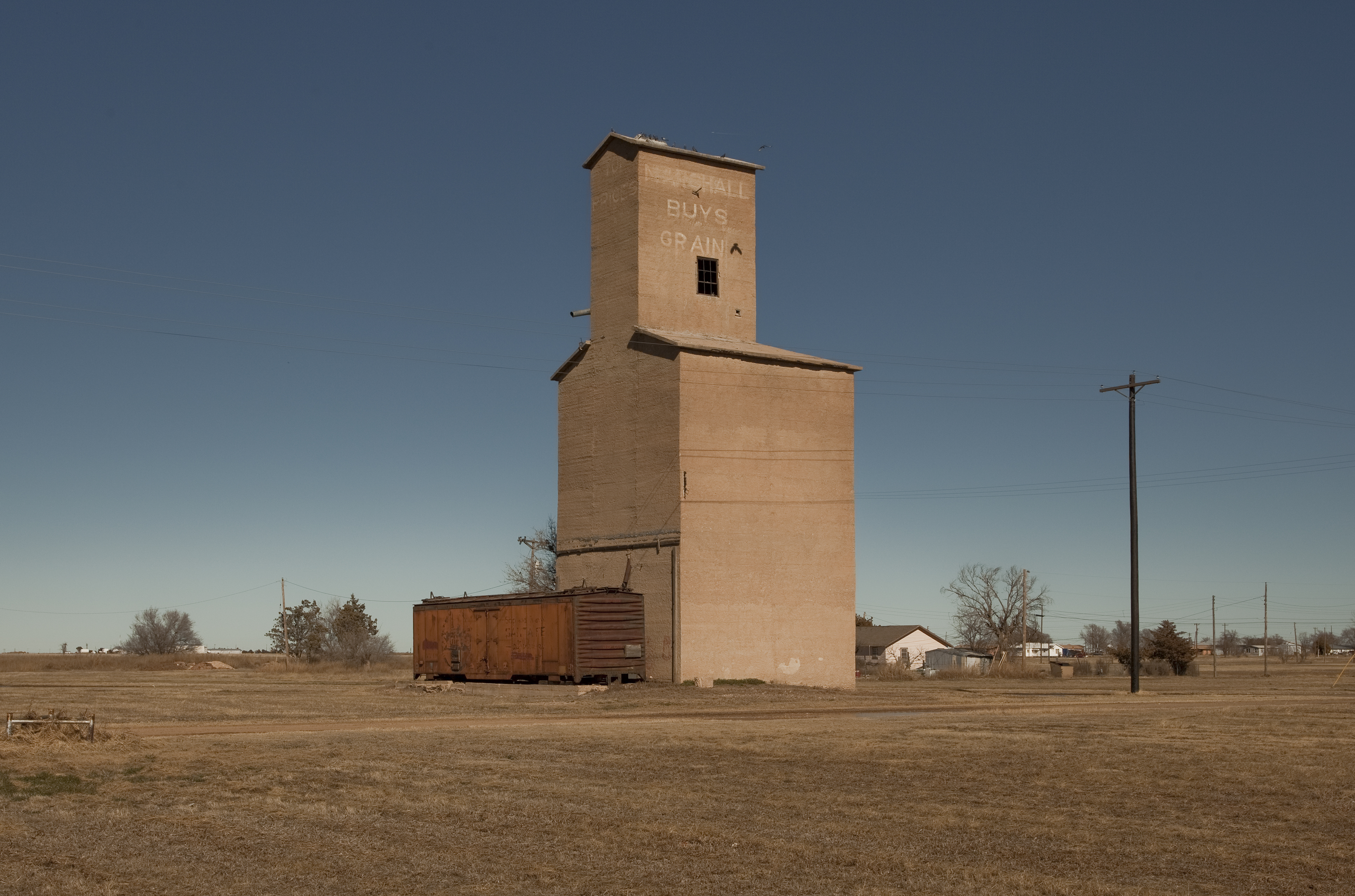
Abandoned grain elevator in Floydada

The region's economy is based on agriculture, but local companies provide services such as custom-built, metal-assembly, irrigation-motor development, efficient rock-crushing systems, and a product called the "Row Stalker".

== Notable people ==
- Colby Carthel (1976-) head football coach at Stephen F. Austin
- Don Williams country music hall of fame
- David R. Holland (1948-), Dallas Morning News sportswriter-columnist, author The Colorado Golf Bible, publisher of D-FW Metroplex Football Magazine, 1978 Texas High School Coaches Association Sportswriter of The Year, Air Force lieutenant colonel

== Nuclear test ==
As part of the Department of Energy Operation Sculpin, "Floydada" was the code name for a 3-kiloton nuclear test conducted at the Nevada Test Site on August 15, 1991. The town's name inaccurately had been among several western ghost towns comprising the set of code names.

== See also ==
- Atchison, Topeka and Santa Fe Railway
- Llano Estacado
- Mount Blanco
- Running Water Draw
- White River (Texas)
