= Valdez Airport =

Airport in Alaska

Valdez Airport Pioneer Field
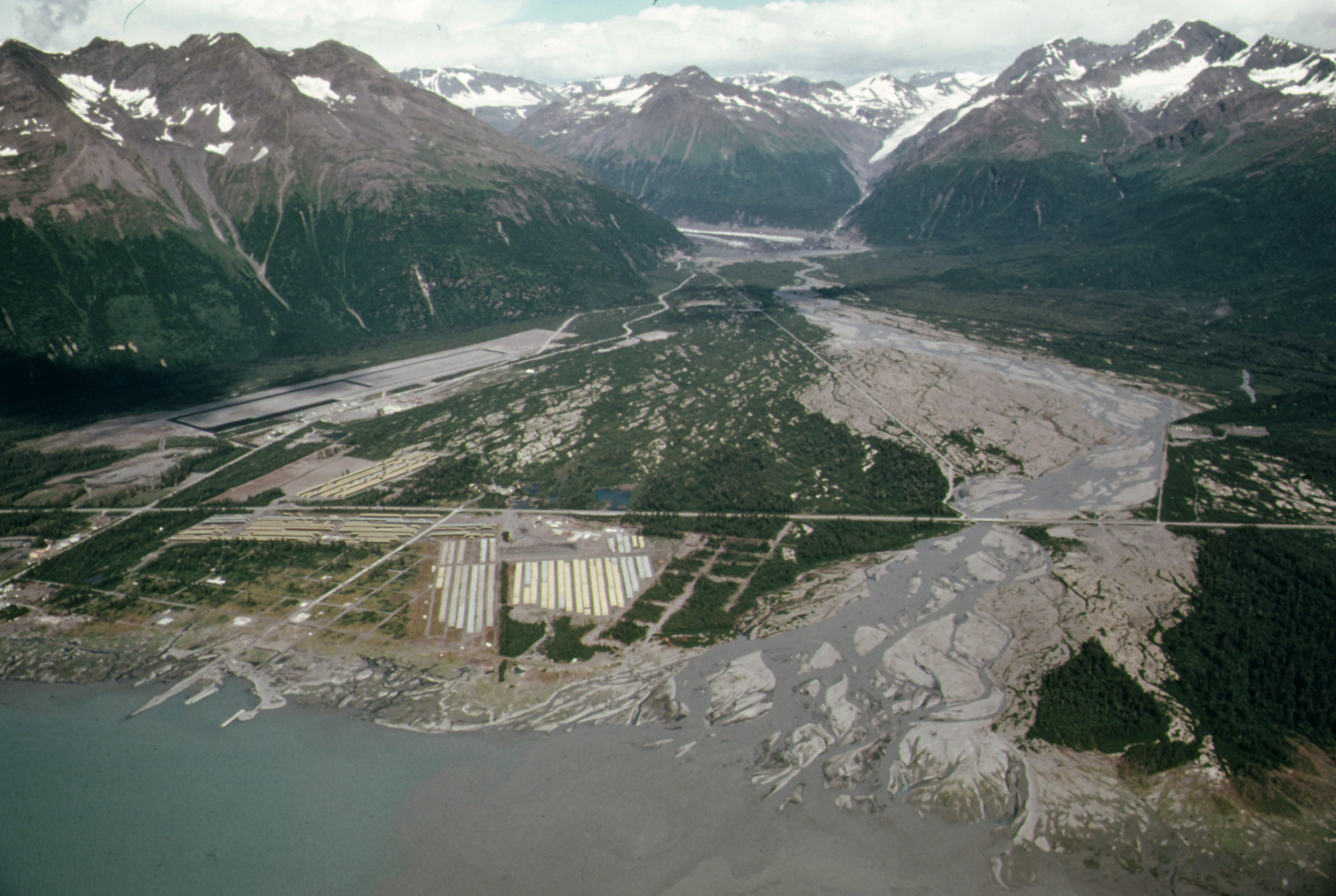
- Valdez Airport, left background, as seen in an aerial photo taken 1974
- IATA: VDZ; ICAO: PAVD; FAA LID: VDZ

Summary
- Airport type: Public
- Operator: State of Alaska DOT&PF - Northern Region
- Serves: Valdez, Alaska
- Elevation AMSL: 128 ft (39 m)
- Coordinates: 61°08′02″N 146°14′54″W

Map
- Location within Alaska

Runways
Direction	Length		Surface
Direction	ft	m	Surface
6/24	6,500	1,981	Asphalt

Statistics (2021)
- Aircraft operations: 10,300
- Based aircraft: 35
- Source: Federal Aviation Administration

Valdez Airport (IATA: VDZ, ICAO: PAVD, FAA LID: VDZ), also known as Pioneer Field, is a state-owned public-use airport located three nautical miles (6 km) east of the central business district of Valdez, a city in the Chugach Census Area of the U.S. state of Alaska.

== Facilities and aircraft ==
Valdez Airport covers an area of 836 acres (338 ha) at an elevation of 128 feet (39 m) above mean sea level. It has one asphalt paved runway designated 6/24 which measures 6,500 by 150 feet (1,981 x 46 m).

For the 12-month period ending December 31, 2021, the airport had 10,300 aircraft operations, an average of 28 per day: 37% air taxi, 53% general aviation, 5% commercial, and 5% military. At that time there were 35 aircraft based at this airport: 25 single-engine, 1 multi-engine, 7 helicopter and 2 ultralight.

== Airlines and destinations ==
Historically, the airport had scheduled passenger jet service provided by Alaska Airlines during the mid-1970s. The Alaska Airlines system timetable dated February 1, 1975 lists a Boeing 727-100 flight nonstop to Anchorage. Era Aviation served the airport during the 1980s with Convair 580 and de Havilland Canada DHC-7 Dash 7 turboprops.

Airlines	Destinations	Refs
Reeve Air Alaska	Anchorage, Fairbanks	

== Accidents near VDZ ==
- On April 25, 1964, an Air National Guard Fairchild C-123 Provider impacted Prince William Sound 1.5 km off shore 3 minutes after takeoff at night during heavy snowfall. All 4 occupants were killed.
- On February 25, 1985, a USAF Boeing RC-135 crashed into a mountain after a few MLS approaches to Valdez Airport in poor visibility. All 3 occupants died.

== See also ==
- List of airports in Alaska
