= Mike White (defensive lineman) =

American football player and coach (born 1957)

No. 63, 70
- Position: Defensive tackle

Personal information
- Born: August 11, 1957 (age 69); Augusta, Georgia, U.S.
- Listed height: 6 ft 5 in (1.96 m)
- Listed weight: 266 lb (121 kg)

Career information
- High school: Westside (GA)
- College: Albany State (1978–1980)
- NFL draft: 1979: 4th round, 84th overall pick

Career history

Playing
- Cincinnati Bengals (1979–1980); Seattle Seahawks (1981–1982)

Coaching
- Albany State (1984–1988) Defensive line coach; Albany State (1989–1996) Defensive coordinator; Albany State (1997–1999) Assistant head coach; Albany State (2000–2014) Head coach; Benedict (2015–2019) Head coach

Awards and highlights
- As a coach: 6× SIAC Coach of The Year (2002–2005, 2010, 2014)

Head coaching record
- Career: 131–81
- Stats at Pro Football Reference

James Michael White (born August 11, 1957) is an American college football coach and former professional player. He served as head football coach at Albany State University (ASU) in Albany, Georgia from 2000 to 2014 and Benedict College in Columbia, South Carolina from 2015 to 2019. White played college football as a defensive tackle at Albany State during the late 1970s, and later was drafted by the Cincinnati Bengals in the fourth round of the 1979 NFL draft. He also played for the Seattle Seahawks.

== Coaching career ==
After his playing career ended, White joined the coaching staff at his alma mater in 1984 as the defensive line coach, and was promoted to defensive coordinator in 1989. In 1997, White became the assistant head coach, and in 2000, was named head coach of the Albany State Golden Rams. He continued to serve as the defensive coordinator while he was head coach. His 2010 Albany State team was named SBN Black College National Champions.

On December 18, 2014, White was named head football coach at Benedict College in Columbia, South Carolina.

== Head coaching record ==
Year	Team	Overall	Conference	Standing	Bowl/playoffs	AFCA^{#}
Albany State Golden Rams (Southern Intercollegiate Athletic Conference) (2000–2014)
2000	Albany State	4–6	3–4	T–4th		
2001	Albany State	4–6	3–4	T–4th		
2002	Albany State	7–4	6–2	T–2nd		
2003	Albany State	10–2	7–1	1st	W Pioneer	
2004	Albany State	11-1	8–0	1st	L NCAA Division II Quarterfinal	5
2005	Albany State	8–2	8–1	T–1st	L NCAA Division II First Round	9
2006	Albany State	7–4	6–1	T–1st	L NCAA Division II First Round	
2007	Albany State	8–3	6–1	2nd	L NCAA Division II First Round	
2008	Albany State	7–4	6–3	T–3rd	L NCAA Division II First Round	
2009	Albany State	8–3	7–2	2nd	L NCAA Division II First Round	22
2010	Albany State	11–1	9–0	1st	L NCAA Division II Quarterfinal	4
2011	Albany State	8–4	6–1	T–1st (East)	L NCAA Division II First Round	
2012	Albany State	6–4	5–2	2nd (East)		
2013	Albany State	6–4	4–0	1st (East)		
2014	Albany State	7–3	7–0	1st (East)		
Albany State:		112–51	91–22			
Benedict Tigers (Southern Intercollegiate Athletic Conference) (2015–2019)
2015	Benedict	0–10	0–4	5th (East)		
2016	Benedict	5–6	3–2	3rd (East)		
2017	Benedict	7–2	4–1	2nd (East)		
2018	Benedict	6–3	4–2	2nd (East)		
2019	Benedict	1–9	1–5	5th (East)		
Benedict:		19–30	12–14			
Total:		131–81				
National championship Conference title Conference division title or championship game berth
