= 2004 Albany State Golden Rams football team =

American college football season

2004 Albany State Golden Rams football

Black college national champion SIAC champion

NCAA Division II Quarterfinal, L 24–38 vs. Valdosta State
- Conference: Southern Intercollegiate Athletic Conference
- Record: 11–1 (8–0 SIAC)
- Head coach: Mike White (5th season)
- Home stadium: Albany State University Coliseum

2004 Southern Intercollegiate Athletic Conference football standings
	Conf.			Overall
Team	W		L	W		L
No. 5 Albany State $^	8	–	0	11	–	1
No. 22 Tuskegee	7	–	1	10	–	2
Miles	6	–	2	7	–	3
Kentucky State	5	–	3	7	–	4
Fort Valley State	4	–	4	7	–	4
Morehouse	3	–	5	4	–	6
Benedict	2	–	6	3	–	8
Clark Atlanta	1	–	7	1	–	9
Lane	0	–	8	2	–	9
+ – Conference co-champions; ^ – NCAA Division II playoff participant; Rankings from AFCA Poll

The 2004 Albany State Golden Rams football team represented Albany State University as a member of the Southern Intercollegiate Athletic Conference (SIAC) during the 2004 NCAA Division II football season. Led by fifth-year head coach Mike White, the Golden Rams compiled an overall record of 11–1, with a conference record of 8–0, and finished as SIAC champion. At the conclusion of the season, Albany State were also recognized as black college national champion after they advanced to the NCAA Division II Quarterfinal and lost to Valdosta State.

== Schedule ==
Date	Opponent	Rank	Site	Result	Attendance	Source
August 28	Miles	No. 22	Albany State University Coliseum; Albany, GA	W 17–13		
September 4	No. 3 Valdosta State*	No. 22	Albany State University Coliseum; Albany, GA	W 24–22	11,855	
September 11	at Kentucky State	No. 13	Alumni Field; Frankfort, KY	W 42–7		
September 18	Lane	No. 11	Albany State University Coliseum; Albany, GA	W 55–6		
October 2	at No. 17 Tuskegee	No. 8	Abbott Memorial Alumni Stadium; Tuskegee, AL	W 33–29		
October 9	vs. Savannah State*	No. 7	Henderson Stadium; Macon, GA (Music City Classic)	W 37–19		
October 16	Clark Atlanta	No. 6	Albany State University Coliseum; Albany, GA	W 58–0		
October 23	at Benedict	No. 4	Charlie W. Johnson Stadium; Columbia, SC	W 47–7		
October 30	at Morehouse	No. 4	B. T. Harvey Stadium; Atlanta, GA	W 50–15		
November 6	vs. Fort Valley State	No. 3	A. J. McClung Memorial Stadium; Columbus, GA (Fountain City Classic)	W 20–19		
November 20	No. 12 Arkansas Tech*	No. 2	Albany State University Coliseum; Albany, GA (NCAA Division II Second round)	W 42–24		
November 27	No. 3 Valdosta State*	No. 2	Albany State University Coliseum; Albany, GA (NCAA Division II Quarterfinal)	L 24–38	10,227	
*Non-conference game; Rankings from AFCA Poll released prior to the game
