= Pat Riepma =

American football and baseball coach (1961–2015)

Biographical details
- Born: February 15, 1961; Grand Rapids, Michigan, U.S.
- Died: July 14, 2015 (aged 54); Midland, Michigan, U.S.

Playing career

Football
- 1979–1982: Hillsdale
- Position: Quarterback

Coaching career (HC unless noted)

Football
- 1983: Columbia Central HS (MI) (assistant)
- 1984: Central Michigan (GA)
- 1985–1992: Hillsdale (assistant)
- 1993–2007: Northwood
- 2014: Northwood

Baseball
- 1985–1988: Hillsdale

Head coaching record
- Overall: 94–75–2 (football)
- Tournaments: Football; 1–4 (NCAA D-II playoffs)

Accomplishments and honors

Championships
- Football; 3 GLIAC (1999–2000, 2004)

Awards
- Football; 2× MIFC Coach of the Year (1996, 1998); 2× GLIAC Coach of the Year (1999–2000)

Patrick Timothy Riepma (February 15, 1961 – July 14, 2015) was an American football and baseball coach. He served two stints as the head football coach at Northwood University in Midland, Michigan, from 1993 to 2007, and again in 2014, compiling a record of record of 94–75–2.

Riepma was born on February 15, 1961, in Grand Rapids, Michigan. He died from lung cancer, on July 14, 2015, at his home in Midland.

== Head coaching record ==
=== Football ===
Year	Team	Overall	Conference	Standing	Bowl/playoffs	AFCA^{#}
Northwood Timberwolves (Midwest Intercollegiate Football Conference) (1993–1998)
1993	Northwood	3–7–1	2–7–1	9th		
1994	Northwood	2–7–1	2–7–1	T–10th		
1995	Northwood	2–8	2–8	T–10th		
1996	Northwood	6–5	5–5	6th		
1997	Northwood	3–7	3–7	T–7th		
1998	Northwood	7–3	7–3	T–4th		
Northwood Timberwolves (Great Lakes Intercollegiate Athletic Conference) (1999–2007)
1999	Northwood	8–2	7–2	T–1st		
2000	Northwood	10–2	9–1	T–1st	L NCAA Division II Quarterfinal	10
2001	Northwood	3–6	3–6	T–7th		
2002	Northwood	7–4	7–3	4th		
2003	Northwood	6–4	6–4	3rd		
2004	Northwood	10–2	9–1	T–1st	L NCAA Division II Second Round	10
2005	Northwood	9–3	9–1	2nd	L NCAA Division II First Round	18
2006	Northwood	8–3	8–2	2nd	L NCAA Division II First Round	18
2007	Northwood	5–5	5–5	T–6th		
Northwood Timberwolves (Great Lakes Intercollegiate Athletic Conference) (2014)
2014	Northwood	5–6	4–6	T–5th (North)		
Northwood:		94–75–2	88–70–2			
Total:		94–75–2				
National championship Conference title Conference division title or championship game berth
