= 2003 Albany State Golden Rams football team =

American college football season

2003 Albany State Golden Rams football

Black college national champion SIAC champion

Pioneer Bowl, W 52–30 vs. Fayetteville State
- Conference: Southern Intercollegiate Athletic Conference
- Record: 10–2 (7–1 SIAC)
- Head coach: Mike White (4th season)
- Home stadium: Hugh Mills Stadium

2003 Southern Intercollegiate Athletic Conference football standings
	Conf.			Overall
Team	W		L	W		L
Albany State # $	7	–	1	10	–	2
Miles	6	–	2	7	–	3
Kentucky State	6	–	2	7	–	4
Fort Valley State	5	–	3	7	–	4
Benedict	4	–	4	6	–	5
Tuskegee	4	–	4	5	–	6
Morehouse	3	–	5	4	–	7
Lane	1	–	7	2	–	9
Clark Atlanta	0	–	8	0	–	11
$ – Conference champion; # – Pioneer Bowl participant

The 2003 Albany State Golden Rams football team represented Albany State University as a member of the Southern Intercollegiate Athletic Conference (SIAC) during the 2003 NCAA Division II football season. Led by fourth-year head coach Mike White, the Golden Rams compiled an overall record of 10–2, with a conference record of 7–1, and finished as SIAC champion. At the conclusion of the season, Albany State were also recognized as black college national champion after they defeated Fayetteville State in the Pioneer Bowl.

== Schedule ==
Date	Opponent	Site	Result	Source
August 30	at No. 2 Valdosta State*	Bazemore–Hyder Stadium; Valdosta, GA	L 3–21	
September 6	at Miles	Albert J. Sloan–Alumni Stadium; Fairfield, AL	W 27–12	
September 13	at West Georgia*	Grisham Stadium; Carrollton, GA	W 34–7	
September 20	Kentucky State	Hugh Mills Stadium; Albany, GA	L 13–19	
September 27	at Lane	Rothrock Stadium; Jackson, TN	W 52–7	
October 4	vs. Savannah State*	Henderson Stadium; Macon, GA (Music City Classic)	W 56–0	
October 11	Tuskegee	Hugh Mills Stadium; Albany, GA	W 31–20	
October 25	at Clark Atlanta	Panther Stadium; Atlanta, GA	W 56–7	
November 1	Benedict	Hugh Mills Stadium; Albany, GA	W 40–0	
November 8	Morehouse	Hugh Mills Stadium; Albany, GA	W 43–15	
November 15	vs. Fort Valley State	A. J. McClung Memorial Stadium; Columbus, GA (Fountain City Classic)	W 27–17	
December 20	vs. Fayetteville State*	Georgia Dome; Atlanta, GA (Pioneer Bowl)	W 52–30	
*Non-conference game; Rankings from AFCA Poll released prior to the game
