= Northwood Timberwolves football, 2000–2009 =

American college football season

2000–2009 Northwood Timberwolves football
- Conference: Great Lakes Intercollegiate Athletic Conference
- Head coach: Pat Riepma (1993–2007); Mike Sullivan (2008–2013)

The Northwood Timberwolves football program, 2000–2009 represented Northwood University during the 2000s in NCAA Division II college football as a member of the Great Lakes Intercollegiate Athletic Conference (GLIAC). The team, sometimes referred to as the "T-Wolves", was led during the decade by two head coaches: Pat Riepma (1993–2007); and Mike Sullivan (2008–2013). Highlights from the decade included:

- The 2000 Northwood Timberwolves football team compiled a 10–2 record, tied with Saginaw Valley State for the GLIAC championship, losing to Bloomsburg in the second round of the NCAA Division II playoffs.
- The 2004 team compiled a 10–2 record, tied for the GLIAC championship, and lost to Grand Valley State in the second round of the Division II playoffs.
- The 2005 team compiled a 9–3 record, finished third in the GLIAC, and lost to Saginaw Valley State in the Division II playoffs.
- The 2006 team compiled an 8–3 record, finished second in the GLIAC, and lost in overtime to South Dakota in the Division II playoffs.

Northwood played its home games at Hantz Stadium in Midland, Michigan.

== Decade overview ==
Year	Head coach	Overall record	Conf. record	Conf. rank	Points scored	Points allowed	Delta
2000	Pat Riepma	10–2	9–1	T1	409	259	+150
2001	Pat Riepma	3–6	3–3	T8	250	251	-1
2002	Pat Riepma	7–4	7–3	4	350	310	+40
2003	Pat Riepma	6–5	6–4	3	307	250	+57
2004	Pat Riepma	10–2	9–1	T1	483	234	+249
2005	Pat Riepma	9–3	8–2	T3	399	220	+179
2006	Pat Riepma	8–3	8–2	2	297	201	+96
2007	Pat Riepma	5–5	5–5	T6	311	328	-17
2008	Mike Sullivan	2–8	2–8	T9	215	310	-95
2009	Mike Sullivan	7–3	7–3	4	276	213	+63
TOTAL		67–41	64–32				

== 2000 ==
2000 Northwood Timberwolves football

NCAA Division II playoffs, L 14–38 vs. Bloomsburg
- Conference: Great Lakes Intercollegiate Athletic Conference

Ranking
- AFCA: No. 2 (Northeast Region)
- Record: 10–2 (9–1 GLIAC)
- Head coach: Pat Riepma (8th season)

2000 Great Lakes Intercollegiate Athletic Conference football standings
	Conf.			Overall
Team	W		L	W		L
No. 2 Northwood +^	9	–	1	10	–	2
No. 4 Saginaw Valley State +^	9	–	1	9	–	3
Grand Valley State	7	–	3	7	–	4
Northern Michigan	6	–	4	6	–	5
Ashland	5	–	5	6	–	5
Michigan Tech	5	–	5	5	–	5
Ferris State	5	–	5	5	–	6
Wayne State (MI)	4	–	6	4	–	6
Mercyhurst	4	–	6	4	–	7
Hillsdale	2	–	8	3	–	8
Indianapolis	2	–	8	3	–	8
Findlay	2	–	8	2	–	8
+ – Conference co-champions; ^ – NCAA Division II playoff participant; Rankings from AFCA Northeast Region poll

The 2000 Northwood Timberwolves football team represented Northwood University as a member of the Great Lakes Intercollegiate Athletic Conference (GLIAC) during the 2000 NCAA Division II football season. In their eighth year under head coach Pat Riepma, the Timberwolves compiled a 10–2 record (9–1 in conference games), tied for the GLIAC championship, and outscored opponents by a total of 409 to 259.

=== Schedule ===
Date	Time	Opponent	Rank	Site	Result	Attendance	Source
September 9	7:00 p.m.	Hillsdale	No. 17	Midland Stadium; Midland, MI	W 34–26	4,654	
September 16	7:00 p.m.	at Grand Valley State	No. 15	Lubbers Stadium; Allendale, MI	W 45–17	8,951	
September 23	1:30 p.m.	at Mercyhurst	No. 14	Tullio Field; Erie, PA	W 42–35	2,625	
September 30	12:00 p.m.	Ferris State	No. 3 (Northeast)	Juillerat Stadium; Midland, MI	L 14–28	4,820	
October 7	12:00 p.m.	at No. 10 (Northeast) Michigan Tech	No. 5 (Northeast)	Sherman Field; Houghton, MI	W 40–33	1,780	
October 14	12:00 p.m.	at No. 6 (Northeast) Saginaw Valley State	No. 4 (Northeast)	Wickes Stadium; University Center, MI (Axe Bowl)	W 17–3	7,500	
October 21	12:00 p.m.	Findlay^{†}	No. 4 (Northeast)	Juillerat Stadium; Midland, MI	W 41–22	4,216	
October 28	1:00 p.m.	at Ashland	No. 4 (Northeast)	Community Stadium; Ashland, OH	W 41–14	2,500	
November 4	12:00 p.m.	No. 9 (Northeast) Northern Michigan	No. 2 (Northeast)	Juillerat Stadium; Midland, MI	W 31–15	2,994	
November 11	12:00 p.m.	Wayne State (MI)	No. 2 (Northeast)	Juillerat Stadium; Midland, MI	W 62–28	3,102	
November 18	12:00 p.m.	IUP		Juillerat Stadium; Midland, MI(NCAA Division II playoffs)	W 28–0	1,242	
November 25		at Bloomsburg		Redman Stadium; Bloomsburg, PA (NCAA Division II playoffs)	L 14–38	1,352	
^{†}Homecoming; Rankings from AFCA Poll released prior to the game; All times are in Eastern time

== 2001 ==
2001 Northwood Timberwolves football
- Conference: Great Lakes Intercollegiate Athletic Conference
- Record: 3–6 (3–3 GLIAC)
- Head coach: Pat Riepma (9th season)

2001 Great Lakes Intercollegiate Athletic Conference football standings
	Conf.			Overall
Team	W		L	W		L
No. 2 Grand Valley State $^	9	–	0	13	–	1
No. 6 Saginaw Valley State ^	9	–	1	11	–	2
Ferris State	7	–	3	7	–	4
Indianapolis	6	–	4	7	–	4
Ashland	5	–	5	6	–	5
Michigan Tech	5	–	5	5	–	5
Northern Michigan	3	–	7	4	–	7
Northwood	3	–	6	3	–	6
Wayne State (MI)	3	–	6	3	–	7
Findlay	3	–	7	3	–	8
Hillsdale	3	–	7	3	–	8
Mercyhurst	2	–	7	2	–	7
$ – Conference champion; ^ – NCAA Division II playoff participant; Rankings from AFCA poll

The 2001 Northwood Timberwolves football team represented Northwood University as a member of the Great Lakes Intercollegiate Athletic Conference (GLIAC) during the 2001 NCAA Division II football season. In their ninth year under head coach Pat Riepma, the Timberwolves compiled a 3–6 record (3–3 in conference games), tied for the eighth place in the GLIAC, and were outscored by a total of 251 to 250.

=== Schedule ===
Date	Time	Opponent	Site	Result	Attendance	Source
September 8	7:00 p.m.	at Hillsdale	Frank "Muddy" Waters Stadium; Hillsdale, MI	L 14–21 ^{OT}	4,278	
September 22	12:00 p.m.	Mercyhurst	Juillerat Stadium; Midland, MI	W 51–14	3,125	
September 29	7:00 p.m.	at Ferris State	Top Taggart Field; Big Rapids, MI	L 29–32	2,683	
October 6	12:00 p.m.	Michigan Tech^{†}	Juillerat Stadium; Midland, MI	L 33–55	3,299	
October 13	12:00 p.m.	No. 21 Saginaw Valley State	Hantz Stadium; Midland, MI (Axe Bowl)	L 21–24	2,629	
October 20	6:00 p.m.	at Findlay	Donnell Stadium; Findlay, OH	L 19–31	1,097	
October 27	12:00 p.m.	Ashland	Hantz Stadium; Midland, MI	W 35–31	2,154	
November 3	1:00 p.m.	at Northern Michigan	Superior Dome; Marquette, MI	L 9–17	1,129	
November 10	12:00 p.m.	at Wayne State (MI)	Tom Adams Field; Detroit, MI	W 39–26	1,385	
^{†}Homecoming; Rankings from AFCA Poll released prior to the game; All times are in Eastern time

== 2002 ==
2002 Northwood Timberwolves football
- Conference: Great Lakes Intercollegiate Athletic Conference
- Record: 7–4 (7–3 GLIAC)
- Head coach: Pat Riepma (10th season)

2002 Great Lakes Intercollegiate Athletic Conference football standings
	Conf.			Overall
Team	W		L	W		L
No. 1 Grand Valley State $^	9	–	0	14	–	0
No. 25 Findlay	8	–	2	9	–	2
No. 13 Saginaw Valley State ^	8	–	2	9	–	3
Northwood	7	–	3	7	–	4
Northern Michigan	6	–	4	6	–	5
Ferris State	4	–	5	5	–	5
Indianapolis	4	–	6	5	–	6
Hillsdale	4	–	6	4	–	7
Michigan Tech	3	–	7	3	–	7
Wayne State (MI)	3	–	7	3	–	8
Ashland	2	–	8	2	–	9
Mercyhurst	1	–	9	2	–	9
$ – Conference champion; ^ – NCAA Division II playoff participant; Rankings from AFCA poll

The 2002 Northwood Timberwolves football team represented Northwood University as a member of the Great Lakes Intercollegiate Athletic Conference (GLIAC) during the 2002 NCAA Division II football season. In their tenth year under head coach Pat Riepma, the Timberwolves compiled a 7–4 record (7–3 in conference games), finished in fourth place in the GLIAC, and were outscored by a total of 350 to 310.

=== Schedule ===
Date	Time	Opponent	Site	Result	Attendance	Source
September 7	7:00 p.m.	No. 8 Saginaw Valley State	Midland Stadium; Midland, MI (Axe Bowl)	L 13–47	7,688	
September 14	7:00 p.m.	at Ashland	Community Stadium; Ashland, OH	W 32–7	2,750	
September 21	12:00 p.m.	Findlay	Hantz Stadium; Midland, MI	L 17–18	2,241	
September 28	1:30 p.m.	at Mercyhurst	Tullio Field; Erie, PA	L 14–17	3,300	
October 5	12:00 p.m.	Ferris State	Hantz Stadium; Midland, MI	W 41–24	3,311	
October 12	1:00 p.m.	at Indianapolis	Key Stadium; Indianapolis, IN	W 40–38	4,000	
October 19	12:00 p.m.	Hillsdale	Hantz Stadium; Midland, MI	W 41–34	1,714	
October 26	7:00 p.m.	at No. 1 Grand Valley State	Lubbers Stadium; Allendale, MI	L 14–33	6,544	
November 2	12:00 p.m.	Wayne State (MI)	Hantz Stadium; Midland, MI	W 41–27	1,116	
November 9	12:00 p.m.	at Michigan Tech	Sherman Field; Houghton, MI	W 33–23	891	
November 16	12:00 p.m.	Northern Michigan	Hantz Stadium; Midland, MI	W 64–42	1,141	
Rankings from AFCA Poll released prior to the game; All times are in Eastern time

== 2003 ==
2003 Northwood Timberwolves football
- Conference: Great Lakes Intercollegiate Athletic Conference
- Record: 6–5 (6–4 GLIAC)
- Head coach: Pat Riepma (11th season)

2003 Great Lakes Intercollegiate Athletic Conference football standings
	Conf.			Overall
Team	W		L	W		L
No. 4 Saginaw Valley State $^	10	–	0	12	–	1
No. 1 Grand Valley State ^	9	–	1	14	–	1
Northwood	6	–	4	6	–	5
Ferris State	5	–	5	6	–	5
Findlay	5	–	5	6	–	5
Indianapolis	5	–	5	6	–	5
Michigan Tech	5	–	5	5	–	5
Mercyhurst	4	–	6	5	–	6
Hillsdale	4	–	6	4	–	7
Northern Michigan	3	–	7	3	–	8
Wayne State (MI)	2	–	8	3	–	8
Ashland	2	–	8	2	–	9
$ – Conference champion; ^ – NCAA Division II playoff participant; Rankings from AFCA poll

The 2003 Northwood Timberwolves football team represented Northwood University as a member of the Great Lakes Intercollegiate Athletic Conference (GLIAC) during the 2003 NCAA Division II football season. In their eleventh year under head coach Pat Riepma, the Timberwolves compiled a 6–5 record (6–4 in conference games), finished in third place in the GLIAC, and were outscored by a total of 307 to 250.

=== Schedule ===
Date	Time	Opponent	Site	Result	Attendance	Source
September 6	12:00 p.m.	at No. 7 Saginaw Valley State	Wickes Stadium; University Center, MI (Axe Bowl)	L 14–30	6,131	
September 13	7:00 p.m.	Ashland	Midland Community Stadium; Midland, MI	L 21–24	4,144	
September 20	6:00 p.m.	at No. 18 Findlay	Donnell Stadium; Findlay, OH	W 35–7	3,146	
September 27	12:00 p.m.	Mercyhurst	Hantz Stadium; Midland, MI	W 30–3	2,201	
October 4	7:00 p.m.	at Ferris State	Top Taggart Field; Big Rapids, MI	L 16–40	1,884	
October 11	12:00 p.m.	Indianapolis	Hantz Stadium; Midland, MI	W 52–7	2,825	
October 18	2:30 p.m.	at Hillsdale	Frank "Muddy" Waters Stadium; Hillsdale, MI	W 34–31 ^{2OT}	3,100	
October 25	12:00 p.m.	No. 7 Grand Valley State	Hantz Stadium; Midland, MI	L 14–33	1,933	
November 1	12:00 p.m.	at Wayne State (MI)	Tom Adams Field; Detroit, MI	W 28–24	1,995	
November 8	12:00 p.m.	Michigan Tech	Hantz Stadium; Midland, MI	L 7–34	1,444	
November 15	7:00 p.m.	at Northern Michigan	Superior Dome; Marquette, MI	W 56–17	1,872	
Rankings from AFCA Poll released prior to the game; All times are in Eastern time

== 2004 ==
2004 Northwood Timberwolves football

NCAA Division II Championship Game, L 7–10 vs. Grand Valley State
- Conference: Great Lakes Intercollegiate Athletic Conference

Ranking
- AFCA: No. 10
- Record: 10–2 (9–1 GLIAC)
- Head coach: Pat Riepma (12th season)

2004 Great Lakes Intercollegiate Athletic Conference football standings
	Conf.			Overall
Team	W		L	W		L
No. 10 Northwood +^	9	–	1	10	–	2
No. 11 Michigan Tech +^	9	–	1	9	–	2
No. 9 Grand Valley State ^	8	–	2	10	–	3
No. 25 Saginaw Valley State	7	–	3	7	–	3
Ferris State	6	–	4	6	–	5
Findlay	5	–	5	6	–	5
Ashland	4	–	6	5	–	6
Hillsdale	4	–	6	4	–	7
Mercyhurst	4	–	6	4	–	7
Gannon	3	–	7	4	–	7
Indianapolis	3	–	7	4	–	7
Northern Michigan	2	–	8	2	–	8
Wayne State (MI)	1	–	9	1	–	9
+ – Conference co-champions; ^ – NCAA Division II playoff participant; Rankings from AFCA poll

The 2004 Northwood Timberwolves football team represented Northwood University as a member of the Great Lakes Intercollegiate Athletic Conference (GLIAC) during the 2003 NCAA Division II football season. In their 12th year under head coach Pat Riepma, the Timberwolves compiled a 10–2 record (9–1 in conference games), tied for the GLIAC championship, and outscored opponents by a total of 483 to 234.

=== Schedule ===
Date	Time	Opponent	Rank	Site	Result	Attendance	Source
August 28	12:00 p.m.	at No. 18 Saginaw Valley State	No. 25	Wickes Stadium; University Center, MI (Axe Bowl)	W 24–21	4,781	
September 4	12:00 p.m.	Wayne State (MI)	No. 25	Hantz Stadium; Midland, MI	W 70–3	2,347	
September 11	12:00 p.m.	at Saint Joseph's (IN)*	No. 21	Alumni Stadium; Rensselaer, IN	W 45–18	1,100	
September 18	12:00 p.m.	Mercyhurst	No. 17	Hantz Stadium; Midland, MI	W 56–24	1,749	
September 25	4:00 p.m.	at Findlay	No. 15	Donnell Stadium; Findlay, OH	W 31–24	2,400	
October 2	7:00 p.m.	at Hillsdale	No. 14	Frank "Muddy" Waters Stadium; Hillsdale, MI	W 56–21	1,267	
October 9	12:00 p.m.	Gannon	No. 12	Hantz Stadium; Midland, MI	W 62–21	3,481	
October 16	1:00 p.m.	at No. 13 Michigan Tech	No. 7	Sherman Field; Houghton, MI	L 7–54	2,378	
October 23	7:00 p.m.	at No. 10 Grand Valley State	No. 18	Lubbers Stadium; Allendale, MI	W 35–14	11,041	
October 30	12:00 p.m.	Ferris State	No. 13	Hantz Stadium; Midland, MI	W 42–6	3,187	
November 5	12:00 p.m.	Northern Michigan	No. 11	Hantz Stadium; Midland, MI	W 48–18	2,101	
November 20	12:00 p.m.	No. 9 Grand Valley State*	No. 10	Hantz Stadium; Midland, MI (NCAA Division II playoffs)	L 7–10	4,215	
*Non-conference game; Rankings from AFCA Poll released prior to the game; All times are in Eastern time

== 2005 ==
2005 Northwood Timberwolves football

NCAA Division II playoffs, L 16–31 vs. Saginaw Valley State
- Conference: Great Lakes Intercollegiate Athletic Conference

Ranking
- AFCA: No. 18
- Record: 9–3 (8–2 GLIAC)
- Head coach: Pat Riepma (13th season)

2005 Great Lakes Intercollegiate Athletic Conference football standings
	Conf.			Overall
Team	W		L	W		L
No. 1 Grand Valley State $^	9	–	0	13	–	0
No. 3 Saginaw Valley State * ^	9	–	1	11	–	2
No. 18 Northwood ^	8	–	2	9	–	3
Ashland	8	–	2	9	–	2
Michigan Tech	6	–	3	6	–	3
Indianapolis	5	–	5	6	–	5
Hillsdale	4	–	6	5	–	6
Wayne State (MI)	3	–	7	3	–	7
Ferris State	3	–	7	3	–	8
Gannon	3	–	7	3	–	8
Findlay	2	–	8	3	–	8
Mercyhurst	2	–	8	2	–	8
Northern Michigan	2	–	8	2	–	8
$ – Conference champion; ^ – NCAA Division II playoff participant; * – Saginaw Valley State forfeited all wins, giving all other GLIAC teams except Grand Valley State, Ashland, and Gannon one more official win than shown.; Rankings from AFCA poll

The 2005 Northwood Timberwolves football team represented Northwood University as a member of the Great Lakes Intercollegiate Athletic Conference (GLIAC) during the 2005 NCAA Division II football season. In their 13th year under head coach Pat Riepma, the Timberwolves compiled a 9–3 record (8–2 in conference games), tied for the third place in the GLIAC, and were outscored by a total of 399 to 220.

=== Schedule ===
Date	Time	Opponent	Rank	Site	Result	Attendance	Source
August 27	12:00 p.m.	No. 21 Saginaw Valley State	No. 10	Hantz Stadium; Midland, MI (Axe Bowl)	L 7–9	4,292	
September 3	12:00 p.m.	at Wayne State (MI)	No. 21	Tom Adams Field; Detroit, MI	W 28–14	2,127	
September 10	12:00 p.m.	Saint Joseph's	No. 21	Hantz Stadium; Midland, MI	W 56–21	1,879	
September 17	1:30 p.m.	at Mercyhurst	No. 21	Tullio Field; Erie, PA	W 35–7	1,700	
September 23	12:00 p.m.	Findlay	No. 19	Hantz Stadium; Midland, MI	W 34–17	2,136	
October 1	12:00 p.m.	Hillsdale	No. 19	Hantz Stadium; Midland, MI	W 49–20	2,418	
October 8	1:00 p.m.	at Gannon	No. 15	Gannon University Field; Erie, PA	W 24–7	850	
October 15	12:00 p.m.	No. 19 Michigan Tech	No. 11	Hantz Stadium; Midland, MI	W 24–21	2,922	
October 21	12:00 p.m.	No. 1 Grand Valley State	No. 9	Hantz Stadium; Midland, MI	L 14–30	3,553	
October 29	1:00 p.m.	at Ferris State	No. 15	Top Taggart Field; Big Rapids, MI	W 42–23	2,049	
November 5	7:00 p.m.	at Northern Michigan	No. 13	Superior Dome; Marquette, MI	W 70–20	1,856	
November 12	12:00 p.m.	at No. 4 Saginaw Valley State	No. 10	Wickes Stadium; University Center, MI	L 16–31	4,300	
Rankings from AFCA Poll released prior to the game; All times are in Eastern time

== 2006 ==
2006 Northwood Timberwolves football

NCAA Division II playoffs, L 28–31 (OT) vs. South Dakota
- Conference: Great Lakes Intercollegiate Athletic Conference

Ranking
- AFCA: No. 18
- Record: 8–3 (8–2 GLIAC)
- Head coach: Pat Riepma (14th season)

2006 Great Lakes Intercollegiate Athletic Conference football standings
	Conf.			Overall
Team	W		L	W		L
No. 1 Grand Valley State $^	10	–	0	15	–	0
No. 18 Northwood ^	8	–	2	8	–	3
Ferris State	7	–	3	8	–	3
Michigan Tech	6	–	4	6	–	4
Saginaw Valley State	6	–	4	6	–	4
Wayne State (MI)	6	–	4	6	–	5
Indianapolis	5	–	5	6	–	5
Hillsdale	5	–	5	5	–	6
Ashland	4	–	6	4	–	6
Mercyhurst	3	–	7	3	–	7
Northern Michigan	3	–	7	3	–	7
Findlay	1	–	9	2	–	9
Gannon	1	–	9	1	–	10
$ – Conference champion; ^ – NCAA Division II playoff participant; Rankings from AFCA poll

The 2006 Northwood Timberwolves football team represented Northwood University as a member of the Great Lakes Intercollegiate Athletic Conference (GLIAC) during the 2006 NCAA Division II football season. In their 15th year under head coach Pat Riepma, the Timberwolves compiled an 8–3 record (8–2 in conference games), finished in second place in the GLIAC, and outscored opponents by a total of 297 to 201.

=== Schedule ===
Date	Time	Opponent	Rank	Site	Result	Attendance	Source
September 2	1:30 p.m.	at Mercyhurst	No. 25	Tullio Field; Erie, PA	W 33–14	630	
September 9	12:00 p.m.	Findlay	No. 23	Hantz Stadium; Midland, MI	W 29–6	1,951	
September 16	1:00 p.m.	at Michigan Tech	No. 18	Sherman Field; Houghton, MI	W 13–7	2,020	
September 23	12:00 p.m.	Ashland	No. 14	Hantz Stadium; Midland, MI	W 33–19	2,113	
September 30	12:00 p.m.	at No. 12 Saginaw Valley State	No. 14	Wickes Stadium; University Center, MI (Axe Bowl)	W 25–14	3,512	
October 7	12:00 p.m.	Northern Michigan	No. 10	Hantz Stadium; Midland, MI	W 44–14	3,111	
October 21	7:00 p.m.	at No. 1 Grand Valley State	No. 9	Lubbers Stadium; Allendale, MI	L 7–45	13,480	
October 28	12:00 p.m.	Wayne State (MI)	No. 17	Hantz Stadium; Midland, MI	W 48–34	1,405	
November 4	12:00 p.m.	Ferris State	No. 14	Hantz Stadium; Midland, MI	L 14–17	2,096	
November 11	1:00 p.m.	at Indianapolis	No. 21	Key Stadium; Indianapolis, IN	W 23–0	1,372	
November 18	12:00 p.m.	No. 16 South Dakota*	No. 20	Hantz Stadium; Midland, MI (NCAA Division II playoffs)	L 28–31 ^{OT}	1,412	
*Non-conference game; Rankings from AFCA Poll released prior to the game; All times are in Eastern time

== 2007 ==
2007 Northwood Timberwolves football
- Conference: Great Lakes Intercollegiate Athletic Conference
- Record: 5–5 (5–5 GLIAC)
- Head coach: Pat Riepma (15th season)

2007 Great Lakes Intercollegiate Athletic Conference football standings
	Conf.			Overall
Team	W		L	W		L
No. 4 Grand Valley State $^	9	–	0	12	–	1
No. 22 Ashland ^	8	–	1	8	–	2
Hillsdale	7	–	3	8	–	3
Saginaw Valley State *	7	–	3	7	–	3
Michigan Tech	6	–	4	6	–	5
Ferris State	5	–	5	6	–	5
Indianapolis	5	–	5	6	–	5
Northwood	5	–	5	5	–	5
Northern Michigan	4	–	6	4	–	6
Findlay	3	–	7	4	–	7
Mercyhurst	3	–	7	4	–	7
Wayne State (MI)	2	–	8	3	–	8
Gannon	0	–	10	0	–	11
$ – Conference champion; ^ – NCAA Division II playoff participant; * – Saginaw Valley State forfeited wins against Gannon, Ferris State, Northern Michigan, and Findlay.; Rankings from AFCA poll

The 2007 Northwood Timberwolves football team represented Northwood University as a member of the Great Lakes Intercollegiate Athletic Conference (GLIAC) during the 2007 NCAA Division II football season. In their 15th year under head coach Pat Riepma, the Timberwolves compiled a 5–5 record (5–5 in conference games), finished in a three-way tie for sixth place in the GLIAC, and were outscored by a total of 328 to 311.

=== Schedule ===
Date	Time	Opponent	Rank	Site	Result	Attendance	Source
September 1	12:00 p.m.	Mercyhurst	No. 15	Hantz Stadium; Midland, MI	W 28–10	2,405	
September 8	1:00 p.m.	at Findlay	No. 13	Donnell Stadium; Findlay, OH	W 21–17	1,435	
September 15	12:00 p.m.	Michigan Tech	No. 13	Hantz Stadium; Midland, MI	L 41–43	2,407	
September 22	1:00 p.m.	at Ashland	No. 23	Community Stadium; Ashland, OH	L 24–54	2,844	
September 29	12:00 p.m.	Saginaw Valley State		Hantz Stadium; Midland, MI (Axe Bowl)	W 28–10	4,199	
October 6	4:00 p.m.	at Northern Michigan		Superior Dome; Marquette, MI	L 18–28	3,509	
October 20	12:00 p.m.	No. 1 Grand Valley State		Hantz Stadium; Midland, MI	L 20–51	4,113	
October 27	12:00 p.m.	at Wayne State (MI)		Tom Adams Field; Detroit, MI	W 45–25	1,786	
November 3	2:00 p.m.	at Ferris State		Top Taggart Field; Big Rapids, MI	L 41–48 ^{OT}	1,802	
November 10	12:00 p.m.	Indianapolis		Hantz Stadium; Midland, MI	W 45–42 ^{OT}	1,619	
Rankings from AFCA Poll released prior to the game; All times are in Eastern time

== 2008 ==
2008 Northwood Timberwolves football
- Conference: Great Lakes Intercollegiate Athletic Conference
- Record: 2–8 (2–8 GLIAC)
- Head coach: Pat Riepma (16th season)

2008 Great Lakes Intercollegiate Athletic Conference football standings
	Conf.			Overall
Team	W		L	W		L
No. 4 Grand Valley State $^	10	–	0	11	–	1
No. 15 Ashland ^	8	–	2	9	–	4
Michigan Tech	7	–	3	8	–	3
Wayne State (MI)	7	–	3	8	–	3
Saginaw Valley State	7	–	3	7	–	3
Hillsdale	6	–	4	7	–	4
Ferris State	5	–	5	6	–	5
Indianapolis	4	–	6	5	–	6
Northern Michigan	2	–	8	2	–	8
Northwood	2	–	8	2	–	8
Findlay	1	–	9	2	–	9
Tiffin	1	–	9	1	–	10
+ – Conference co-champions; ^ – NCAA Division II playoff participant; Rankings from AFCA poll

The 2008 Northwood Timberwolves football team represented Northwood University as a member of the Great Lakes Intercollegiate Athletic Conference (GLIAC) during the 2008 NCAA Division II football season. In their 16th year under head coach Pat Riepma, the Timberwolves compiled a 2–8 record (2–8 in conference games), tied for ninth place in the GLIAC, and were outscored by a total of 310 to 215.

=== Schedule ===
Date	Time	Opponent	Site	Result	Attendance	Source
September 6	4:00 p.m.	at Northern Michigan	Superior Dome; Marquette, MI	L 7–30	4,487	
September 13	2:30 p.m.	at Hillsdale	Frank "Muddy" Waters Stadium; Hillsdale, MI	L 7–26	989	
September 20	12:00 p.m.	Saginaw Valley State	Hantz Stadium; Midland, MI (Axe Bowl)	L 45–46	4,329	
September 27	12:00 p.m.	Findlay	Hantz Stadium; Midland, MI	W 31–24	1,432	
October 4	6:00 p.m.	at Indianapolis	Key Stadium; Indianapolis, IN	L 23–27	5,263	
October 11	12:00 p.m.	Ashland	Hantz Stadium; Midland, MI	L 24–43	2,521	
October 18	1:30 p.m.	at Tiffin	Frost–Kalnow Stadium; Tiffin, OH	W 31–28	875	
October 25	12:00 p.m.	at Ferris State	Top Taggart Field; Big Rapids, MI	L 13–19	1,633	
November 1	12:00 p.m.	Wayne State	Hantz Stadium; Midland, MI	L 21–42	1,254	
November 8	12:00 p.m.	Michigan Tech	Hantz Stadium; Midland, MI	L 13–25	1,012	
All times are in Eastern time

== 2009 ==
2009 Northwood Timberwolves football
- Conference: Great Lakes Intercollegiate Athletic Conference
- Record: 7–3 (7–3 GLIAC)
- Head coach: Pat Riepma (17th season)

2009 Great Lakes Intercollegiate Athletic Conference football standings
	Conf.			Overall
Team	W		L	W		L
No. 2 Grand Valley State $^	9	–	1	13	–	2
No. 11 Hillsdale ^	8	–	2	10	–	3
No. 19 Saginaw Valley State ^	8	–	2	9	–	3
Northwood	7	–	3	7	–	3
Findlay	6	–	4	7	–	4
Northern Michigan	6	–	4	6	–	4
Ashland	6	–	4	6	–	5
Wayne State (MI)	5	–	5	6	–	5
Indianapolis	3	–	7	4	–	7
Michigan Tech	2	–	8	2	–	8
Ferris State	0	–	10	1	–	10
Tiffin	0	–	10	0	–	11
$ – Conference champion; ^ – NCAA Division II playoff participant; Rankings from AFCA poll

The 2009 Northwood Timberwolves football team represented Northwood University as a member of the Great Lakes Intercollegiate Athletic Conference (GLIAC) during the 2009 NCAA Division II football season. In their 17th year under head coach Pat Riepma, the Timberwolves compiled a 7–3 record (7–3 in conference games), finished in fourth place in the GLIAC, and outscored opponents by a total of 276 to 213.

=== Schedule ===
Date	Time	Opponent	Site	Result	Attendance	Source
September 5	12:00 p.m.	Northern Michigan	Hantz Stadium; Midland, MI	W 23–21	2,618	
September 12	12:00 p.m.	Hillsdale	Hantz Stadium; Midland, MI	W 38–37	2,207	
September 19	12:00 p.m.	at No. 23 Saginaw Valley State	Wickes Stadium; University Center, MI (Axe Bowl)	L 27–32	6,312	
September 26	12:00 p.m.	at Findlay	Donnell Stadium; Findlay, OH	L 0–14	1,307	
October 3	12:00 p.m.	Indianapolis	Hantz Stadium; Midland, MI	W 17–12	1,918	
October 10	1:00 p.m.	at Ashland	Jack Miller Stadium; Ashland, OH	L 20–33	3,801	
October 17	12:00 p.m.	Tiffin	Hantz Stadium; Midland, MI	W 42–7	1,511	
October 24	12:00 p.m.	Ferris State	Hantz Stadium; Midland, MI	W 33–7	1,922	
October 31	12:00 p.m.	at Wayne State (MI)	Tom Adams Field; Detroit, MI	W 38–24	2,309	
November 7	1:00 p.m.	at Michigan Tech	Sherman Field; Houghton, MI	W 38–26	1,845	
Rankings from AFCA Poll released prior to the game; All times are in Eastern time
