= 2004 Valdosta State Blazers football team =

American college football season

2004 Valdosta State Blazers football

NCAA Division II champion GSC champion

NCAA Division II Championship Game, W 36–31 vs. Pittsburg State
- Conference: Gulf South Conference

Ranking
- AFCA: No. 1
- Record: 13–1 (9–0 GSC)
- Head coach: Chris Hatcher (5th season)
- Offensive coordinator: David Dean (5th season)
- Offensive scheme: Air raid
- Defensive coordinator: Ashley Anders (3rd season)
- Base defense: 3–4
- Home stadium: Bazemore–Hyder Stadium

2004 Gulf South Conference football standings
	Conf.			Overall
Team	W		L	W		L
No. 1 Valdosta State $^	9	–	0	13	–	1
No. 16 Arkansas Tech ^	8	–	1	10	–	2
Central Arkansas	6	–	3	8	–	3
Delta State	6	–	3	6	–	4
Arkansas–Monticello	5	–	4	6	–	5
Harding	4	–	5	6	–	5
North Alabama	4	–	5	5	–	5
Southern Arkansas	3	–	6	5	–	6
West Georgia	2	–	6	2	–	7
Ouachita Baptist	2	–	6	2	–	7
Henderson State	2	–	7	2	–	8
West Alabama	2	–	7	2	–	9
$ – Conference champion; ^ – NCAA Division II playoff participant; Rankings from AFCA poll

The 2004 Valdosta State Blazers football team was an American football team that represented Valdosta State University as a member of the Gulf South Conference (GSC) during the 2004 NCAA Division II football season. In their fifth year under head coach Chris Hatcher, the team compiled a 13–1 record (9–0 against conference opponents) and won the GSC championship. The team advanced to the NCAA Division II playoffs and defeated Pittsburg State, 36–31, in the championship game.

Two Valdosta player were honored by the Associated Press on its 2004 Little All-America team: kicker Will Rhody (first team) and offensive lineman Torry Howard (third team). Other key players included quarterback Fabian Walker and running back Vincent Brown.

The Blazers played their home games at Bazemore–Hyder Stadium in Valdosta, Georgia.

== Schedule ==
Date	Opponent	Rank	Site	Result	Attendance	Source
September 4	at No. 22 Albany State*	No. 3	Albany Municipal Stadium; Albany, GA	L 22–24	11,855	
September 11	at Ouachita Baptist	No. 15	Williams Field; Arkadelphia, AR	W 40–19	3,687	
September 18	Harding	No. 13	Bazemore-Hyder Stadium; Valdosta, GA	W 32–19	5,386	
September 25	at No. 19 Central Arkansas	No. 12	Estes Stadium; Conway, AR	W 22–12	7,117	
October 2	No. 11 Delta State	No. 12	Bazemore-Hyder Stadium; Valdosta, GA	W 51–48	3,204	
October 9	at Henderson State	No. 10	Henderson Stadium; Macon, GA	W 27–18	2,912	
October 16	West Alabama	No. 8	Bazemore-Hyder Stadium; Valdosta, GA	W 34–17	6,843	
October 23	at No. 23 North Alabama	No. 5	Braly Municipal Stadium; Florence, AL	W 24–20	3,577	
October 30	Southern Arkansas	No. 5	Bazemore-Hyder Stadium; Valdosta, GA	W 45–28	2,711	
November 6	at West Georgia	No. 5	Grisham Stadium; Carrollton, GA (rivalry)	W 35–12	4,101	
November 20	No. 13 Carson–Newman*	No. 3	Bazemore-Hyder Stadium; Valdosta, GA (NCAA Division II second round)	W 38–12	3,001	
November 27	at No. 2 Albany State*	No. 3	Albany State University Coliseum; Albany, GA (NCAA Division II quarterfinal)	W 38–24	10,227	
December 4	No. 23 West Chester*	No. 3	Bazemore-Hyder Stadium; Valdosta, GA (NCAA Division II seminfinal)	W 45–21	4,483	
December 11	vs. No. 1 Pittsburg State*	No. 3	Braly Municipal Stadium; Florence, AL (NCAA Division II Championship Game)	W 36–31	8,604	
*Non-conference game; Rankings from AFCA Poll released prior to the game

== Game summaries ==
=== Vs. No. 1 Pittsburg State—NCAA Division II Championship Game ===
2004 NCAA Division II Championship Game
No. 3 Valdosta State Blazers vs. No. 1 Pittsburg State Gorillas – Game summary

Quarter	1	2	3	4	Total
No. 3 Blazers	0	17	9	10	36
No. 1 Gorillas	14	3	7	7	31

at Braly Municipal Stadium, Florence, Alabama

- Date: December 11
- Game time: 4:05 p.m. EST/3:05 p.m. CST
- Game weather: Cloudy, 44 °F (7 °C)
- Game attendance: 8,604
- Referee: Thomas Delaney
- TV announcers (ESPN): Andre Ware and Eric Collins
- Box score

Game information
First quarter
- PSU – Jimmie Taylor 32-yard interception return (Nathan Alleman kick), 14:04. Gorillas 7–0.
- PSU – Jermaine Carpenter 10-yard pass from Neal Philpot (Nathan Alleman kick), 7:37. Gorillas 14–0. Drive: 9 plays, 63 yards, 4:33.

Second quarter

- VSU – Zach Parker 1-yard pass from Fabian Walker (Will Rhody kick), 14:12. Gorillas 14–7. Drive: 4 plays, 19 yards, 1:39.
- PSU – Nathan Alleman 30-yard field goal, 7:54. Gorillas 17–7. Drive: 12 plays, 67 yards, 6:18.
- VSU – Fabian Walker 4-yard run (Will Rhody kick), 2:45. Gorillas 17–14. Drive: 9 plays, 69 yards, 5:02.
- VSU – Will Rhody 27-yard field goal, 0:03. Tied 17–17. Drive: 6 plays, 45 yards, 0:44.

Third quarter

- VSU – Team safety, 13:19. Blazers 19–17.
- VSU – Tyran Robinson 23-yard run (Will Rhody kick), 8:14. Blazers 26–17. Drive: 7 plays, 72 yards, 2:47.
- PSU – Joe Taylor 1-yard run (Nathan Alleman kick), 2:58. Blazers 26–24. Drive: 11 plays, 80 yards, 5:11.

Fourth quarter

- VSU – Raymond Thomas 7-yard pass from Fabian Walker (Will Rhody kick), 14:15. Blazers 33–24. Drive: 8 plays, 65 yards, 3:42.
- VSU – Will Rhody 28-yard field goal, 10:49. Blazers 36–24. Drive: 6 plays, 20 yards, 3:15.
- PSU – Neal Philpot 1-yard run (Nathan Alleman kick), 7:27. Blazers 36–31. Drive: 8 plays, 73 yards, 3:17.

Statistics	VSU	PSU
First downs	21	22
Total yards	366	371
Rushing yards	201	163
Passing yards	165	208
Turnovers	2	4
Time of possession	31:09	28:51

Team	Category	Player	Statistics
Valdosta State	Passing	Fabian Walker	19/27, 165 yards, 2 TD, INT
Valdosta State	Rushing	Vincent Brown	13 rushes, 72 yards
Valdosta State	Receiving	Rod Dalton	4 receptions, 48 yards
Pittsburg State	Passing	Andy Majors	11/14, 148 yards, INT
Pittsburg State	Rushing	Neal Philpot	20 rushes, 117 yards, TD
Pittsburg State	Receiving	Tim Austin	8 rushes, 119 yards

== Roster ==
2004 Valdosta State Blazers football team roster
Players
Coaches
Offense

Pos.	#	Name	Class
WR	3	Raymond Thomas	So
WR	4	Jeffrey Felton	Fr
TE	6	Bama Adams	Jr
QB	7	Fabian Walker	Sr
QB	11	Barrett Wilkes	Jr
QB	13	Sean Calhoun	Sr
RB	14	Vincent Brown	Jr
WR	15	Clay Callaway	Fr
QB	16	Mitch Stewart	Jr
WR	19	Rod Dalton	Sr
RB	20	Tyran Robinson	Sr
WR	21	Darrell Stephens	Sr
RB	25	William Milton	Jr
RB	26	Latray Walker	Jr
WR	28	Travis Taylor	Fr
RB	29	Donald Thomas	So
RB	33	Tyler Pruitt	So
RB	34	Scott Palmer	Fr
RB	36	Sam Brown	So
RB	40	Javaris Weston	Jr
G	50	Davis Russell	Fr
C	51	Robert Summers	Fr
OT	55	Joseph Massingill	Fr
OT	56	Gerald Davis	Fr
G	57	Tonev Howard	Sr
C	58	Paul Streaker	Fr
G	60	Josh Bennett	Fr
G	63	Chris Crosby	Fr
G	64	Jos Edison	So
OT	65	Davis Nall	Fr
OT	67	Will Shelton	Jr
C	68	Leighton Cooley	Sr
G	74	Joseph Lord	Fr
OT	75	Richard Collier	Jr
G	76	Kelvin McDavis	Sr
OT	79	MarceDus Washington	So
TE	80	Robert Broughton	Fr
WR	81	Tommy Parker	Jr
WR	83	Chad Bryant	Fr
WR	84	Tyler Aurandt	So
WR	84	Patrick Wolfe	Jr
TE	85	Zach Parker	Fr
TE	87	Drew Willis	So

Defense

Pos.	#	Name	Class
DT	2	Willie Johnson	Jr
LB	8	Donnie Daniels	Fr
LB	12	Fred Dunn	Sr
DB	19	Shawn Harris	Fr
DB	21	Thomas Arnold	Fr
FS	22	Scott Foss	Jr
S	23	Kevin Adkins	So
CB	24	Michael Flood	So
DB	27	Kip Burdette	Fr
CB	31	Sam Reynolds	Sr
CB	32	Antwan Harris	Jr
S	35	Spencer Fortson	Sr
DB	36	Maurice Leggett	Fr
LB	37	Gio Blalock	So
FS	38	Calvin Roberts	Jr
CB	40	Oscar Patterson	So
DE	42	Dedrick Morrison	Jr
LB	44	Nate Hardage	Sr
LB	45	Cody Thomas	So
LB	47	Phillip Braley	Fr
LB	48	William Montford	Fr
LB	49	Antwan Thomas	So
NG	77	Terel Toomer	Sr
DE	89	Dustin DeHaven	So
DT	90	Derek Cosby	Fr
DE	91	Tim Thompson	Jr
NG	92	James Hutley	Jr
LB	93	Fabian Whylly	Fr
DT	94	Tracy Flounoy	Sr
DE	97	Derrick Hill	Sr
DT	99	Calvin English	Jr

Special teams

Pos.	#	Name	Class
K	5	Chad Gallahan	Fr
P	10	Kenn Barnett	Sr
K	27	Will Rhody	Sr
K	43	Michael Green	Jr
K	46	Stephen Delk	Sr
P	49	Travis Tidwell	So
LS	53	Matt Tanner	Fr
LS	54	John Harrison	Jr
LS	59	Patrick Brantley	Fr

Head coach

- Chris Hatcher

Coordinators/assistant coaches

- Shawn Bostick
  Assistant head coach/Offensive line
- David Dean
  Offensive coordinator/Receivers/Special teams
- Ashley Anders
  Defensive coordinator/Linebackers
- Maurea Crain
  Defensive line/Recruiting coordinator
- Ryan Shirley
  Secondary

Legend

- (C) Team captain
- (S) Suspended
- (I) Ineligible
- Injured
- Redshirt

Roster
