= 2003 UC Davis Aggies football team =

American college football season

2003 UC Davis Aggies football
- Conference: Independent
- Record: 6–4
- Head coach: Bob Biggs (11th season)
- Offensive coordinator: Mike Moroski (11th season)
- Home stadium: Toomey Field

2003 NCAA Division II independents football records
	Conf.			Overall
Team	W		L	W		L
Gannon		–		9	–	1
UC Davis		–		6	–	4
Oklahoma Panhandle State		–		6	–	5
Quincy		–		5	–	6
Western New Mexico		–		3	–	7
Saint Joseph's (IN)		–		2	–	9
Kentucky Wesleyan		–		1	–	9
New Haven		–		1	–	9

The 2003 UC Davis football team represented the University of California, Davis as an independent during the 2003 NCAA Division II football season. Led by 11th-year head coach Bob Biggs, UC Davis compiled a record of 6–4. 2003 was the 34th consecutive winning season for the Aggies, but was the first since 1995 that they failed to qualify for the postseason. The team outscored their opponents 295 to 184 for the season. The Aggies played home games at Toomey Field in Davis, California.

This was the final season that UC Davis competed at the NCAA Division II level as they moved up to NCAA Division I-AA in 2004 as a charter member of the Great West Football Conference (GWFC).

== Schedule ==
Date	Time	Opponent	Site	Result	Attendance	Source
September 6	6:00 p.m.	No. 1 Grand Valley State	Toomey Field; Davis, CA	L 6–9 ^{OT}	6,447	
September 13	5:00 p.m.	at No. 20 North Dakota State	Fargodome; Fargo, ND	W 23–14	14,548	
September 20	4:00 p.m.	at Texas State	Bobcat Stadium; San Marcos, TX	L 32–34	8,764	
October 4	7:35 p.m.	at Sacramento State	Hornet Stadium; Sacramento, CA (Causeway Classic)	W 31–27	15,403	
October 11	6:00 p.m.	Western Oregon	Toomey Field; Davis, CA	W 27–7	6,460	
October 18	1:00 p.m.	Western Washington^{†}	Toomey Field; Davis, CA	W 48–19	7,628	
November 1	1:00 p.m.	at Saint Mary's	Saint Mary's Stadium; Moraga, CA	W 45–14	2,512	
November 8	1:00 p.m.	Cal Poly	Toomey Field; Davis, CA (rivalry)	L 14–18	7,477	
November 15	1:00 p.m.	Central Washington	Toomey Field; Davis, CA	W 41–7	3,497	
November 22	1:00 p.m.	Northern Colorado	Toomey Field; Davis, CA	L 28–35	6,517	
^{†}Homecoming; Rankings from AFCA Poll released prior to the game; All times are in Pacific time

== NFL draft ==
The following UC Davis Aggies players were selected in the 2004 NFL draft.

Player	Position	Round	Overall	NFL team
J. T. O'Sullivan	Quarterback	6	186	New Orleans Saints
