= 2004 Central Arkansas Bears football team =

American college football season

2004 Central Arkansas Bears football
- Conference: Gulf South Conference
- Record: 8–3 (6–3 GSC)
- Head coach: Clint Conque (5th season)
- Offensive coordinator: Brooks Hollingsworth (1st season)
- Home stadium: Estes Stadium

2004 Gulf South Conference football standings
	Conf.			Overall
Team	W		L	W		L
No. 1 Valdosta State $^	9	–	0	13	–	1
No. 16 Arkansas Tech ^	8	–	1	10	–	2
Central Arkansas	6	–	3	8	–	3
Delta State	6	–	3	6	–	4
Arkansas–Monticello	5	–	4	6	–	5
Harding	4	–	5	6	–	5
North Alabama	4	–	5	5	–	5
Southern Arkansas	3	–	6	5	–	6
West Georgia	2	–	6	2	–	7
Ouachita Baptist	2	–	6	2	–	7
Henderson State	2	–	7	2	–	8
West Alabama	2	–	7	2	–	9
$ – Conference champion; ^ – NCAA Division II playoff participant; Rankings from AFCA poll

The 2004 Central Arkansas Bears football team represented the University of Central Arkansas as a member of the Gulf South Conference (GSC) during the 2004 NCAA Division II football season. Led by fifth-year head coach Clint Conque, the Bears compiled a record of 8–3 with a mark of 6–3 in conference play, tying for third place in the GSC. Central Arkansas played home games at Estes Stadium in Conway, Arkansas.

== Schedule ==
Date	Time	Opponent	Rank	Site	Result	Attendance
August 28	7:00 p.m.	at Eastern New Mexico*		Greyhound Stadium; Portales, NM	W 38–31	2,200
September 4	6:00 p.m.	Iowa Wesleyan		Estes Stadium; Conway, AR	W 56–7	5,874
September 11	7:00 p.m.	at No. 20 Southern Arkansas		Wilkins Stadium; Magnolia, AR	W 58–31	5,420
September 18	6:00 p.m.	at Henderson State*	No. 22	Carpenter–Haygood Stadium; Arkadelphia, AR	W 55–12	5,766
September 25	6:00 p.m.	at No. 12 Valdosta State	No. 19	Estes Stadium; Conway, AR	L 12–22	7,117
October 2	6:00 p.m.	at North Alabama	No. 20	Braly Municipal Stadium; Florence, AL	L 3–31	4,776
October 9	6:00 p.m.	Harding		Estes Stadium; Conway, AR	W 28–20	5,427
October 16	4:00 p.m.	at Delta State	No. 25	McCool Stadium; Cleveland, MS	W 55–52	6,341
October 23	6:00 p.m.	Ouachita Baptist	No. 24	Estes Stadium; Conway, AR	W 35–26	6,247
October 30	3:00 p.m.	at Arkansas–Monticello	No. 23	Cotton Boll Stadium; Monticello, AR	L 41–44	4,210
November 6	6:00 p.m.	No. 6 Arkansas Tech		Estes Stadium; Conway, AR	W 49–17 ^{OT}	10,032
*Non-conference game; Rankings from AFCA Poll released prior to the game; All times are in Central time

== Game summaries ==
=== at Eastern New Mexico ===
	1	2	3	4	Total
Bears	7	14	0	7	28
Greyhounds	0	7	14	10	31

=== Iowa Wesleyan ===
	1	2	3	4	Total
Tigers	0	0	7	0	7
Bears	14	21	14	7	56

=== at No. 20 Southern Arkansas ===
	1	2	3	4	Total
Bears	21	24	6	7	58
No. 20 Muleriders	7	3	14	7	31

=== at Henderson State ===
	1	2	3	4	Total
No. 22 Bears	7	21	13	14	55
Reddies	0	6	0	6	12

=== No. 12 Valdosta State ===
	1	2	3	4	Total
No. 12 Blazers	10	6	0	6	22
No. 19 Bears	0	7	0	5	12

=== at North Alabama ===
	1	2	3	4	Total
No. 20 Bears	0	0	3	0	3
Lions	3	0	21	7	31

=== Harding ===
	1	2	3	4	Total
Bisons	3	7	0	10	20
Bears	0	14	14	0	28

=== at Delta State ===
	1	2	3	4	Total
No. 25 Bears	7	21	14	13	55
Statesmen	14	17	7	14	52

=== Ouachita Baptist ===
	1	2	3	4	Total
Tigers	7	0	3	16	26
No. 24 Bears	7	14	0	14	35

=== at Arkansas–Monticello ===
	1	2	3	4	Total
No. 23 Bears	7	6	8	20	41
Boll Weevils	7	14	0	23	44

=== No. 6 Arkansas Tech ===
	1	2	3	4	OT	Total
No. 6 Wonder Boys	14	0	7	7	3	31
Bears	7	7	7	7	10	38
