= 2003 Grand Valley State Lakers football team =

American college football season

2003 Grand Valley State Lakers football

NCAA Division II champion

NCAA Division II Championship Game, W 10–3 vs. North Dakota
- Conference: Great Lakes Intercollegiate Athletic Conference

Ranking
- AFCA: No. 1
- Record: 14–1 (9–1 GLIAC)
- Head coach: Brian Kelly (13th season)
- Offensive coordinator: Jeff Quinn (15th season)
- Defensive coordinator: Chuck Martin (1st season)
- Home stadium: Lubbers Stadium

2003 Great Lakes Intercollegiate Athletic Conference football standings
	Conf.			Overall
Team	W		L	W		L
No. 4 Saginaw Valley State $^	10	–	0	12	–	1
No. 1 Grand Valley State ^	9	–	1	14	–	1
Northwood	6	–	4	6	–	5
Ferris State	5	–	5	6	–	5
Findlay	5	–	5	6	–	5
Indianapolis	5	–	5	6	–	5
Michigan Tech	5	–	5	5	–	5
Mercyhurst	4	–	6	5	–	6
Hillsdale	4	–	6	4	–	7
Northern Michigan	3	–	7	3	–	8
Wayne State (MI)	2	–	8	3	–	8
Ashland	2	–	8	2	–	9
$ – Conference champion; ^ – NCAA Division II playoff participant; Rankings from AFCA poll

The 2003 Grand Valley State Lakers football team was an American football team that won the 2003 NCAA Division II national championship.

The team represented the Grand Valley State University in the Great Lakes Intercollegiate Athletic Conference (GLIAC) during the 2003 NCAA Division II football season. In their 13th season under head coach Brian Kelly, the Lakers compiled a 14–1 record (9–1 against conference opponents), outscored opponents by a total of 551 to 200, and finished second in the GLIAC. The team advanced to the playoffs and won the national championship by defeating North Dakota in the championship game.

The team played its home games at Lubbers Stadium in Allendale Charter Township, Michigan.

== Schedule ==
Date	Time	Opponent	Rank	Site	Result	Attendance	Source
September 6	9:00 p.m.	at UC Davis*	No. 1	Toomey Field; Davis, CA	W 9–6 ^{OT}	6,447	
September 13	7:00 p.m.	Ferris State	No. 1	Lubbers Stadium; Allendale, MI (Anchor–Bone Classic)	W 40–10	12,627	
September 20	7:00 p.m.	Wayne State (MI)	No. 1	Lubbers Stadium; Allendale, MI	W 50–14	10,054	
September 27	7:00 p.m.	at Hillsdale	No. 1	Frank "Muddy" Waters Stadium; Hilllsdale, MI	W 37–24	2,500	
October 4	7:00 p.m.	Michigan Tech^{†}	No. 1	Lubbers Stadium; Allendale, MI	W 48–17	10,034	
October 11	1:00 p.m.	at Northern Michigan	No. 1	Superior Dome; Marquette, MI	W 50–20	3,357	
October 18	7:00 p.m.	No. 5 Saginaw Valley State	No. 1	Lubbers Stadium; Allendale, MI (Battle of the Valleys)	L 20–34	12,832	
October 25	12:00 p.m.	at Northwood	No. 7	Hantz Stadium; Midland, MI	W 33–14	1,933	
November 1	7:00 p.m.	Mercyhurst	No. 6	Lubbers Stadium; Allendale, MI	W 51–6	6,678	
November 8	1:00 p.m.	Indianapolis	No. 4	Lubbers Stadium; Allendale, MI	W 53–10	3,500	
November 15	1:00 p.m.	at Findlay	No. 4	Donnell Stadium; Findlay, OH	W 44–0	591	
November 22	12:00 p.m.	at No. 19 Bentley*	No. 4	Bentley University Football Stadium; Waltham, MA (NCAA Division II first round)	W 62–13	4,433	
November 29	12:00 p.m.	at No. 1 Saginaw Valley State*	No. 4	Harvey Randall Wickes Memorial Stadium; Saginaw, MI (NCAA Division II quarterfinal)	W 10–3	9,267	
December 6	1:00 p.m.	at No. 3 Texas A&M–Kingsville*	No. 4	Javelina Stadium; Kingsville, TX (NCAA Division II semifinal)	W 44–7	10,500	
December 13	4:05 p.m.	vs. No. 7 North Dakota*	No. 4	Braly Municipal Stadium; Florence, AL (NCAA Division II Championship Game)	W 10–3	7,236	
*Non-conference game; ^{†}Homecoming; Rankings from American Football Coaches Association Poll released prior to the game; All times are in Eastern time
