= 2003 North Dakota Fighting Sioux football team =

American college football season

2003 North Dakota Fighting Sioux football

NCC champion

NCAA Division II First Round, L 3–10 vs. Grand Valley State
- Conference: North Central Conference

Ranking
- AFCA: No. 7
- Record: 12–2 (7–0 NCC)
- Head coach: Dale Lennon (5th season)
- Offensive coordinator: Chris Mussman (5th season)
- Defensive coordinator: Bubba Schweigert (7th season)
- Captains: Digger Anderson; Weston Dressler; Danny Gagner; Jeff Glas; Tony Hermes; Chris Kuper; Ryan Manke
- Home stadium: Alerus Center

2003 North Central Conference football standings
| | Conf. | | | Overall |
| Team | W | | L | W | | L |
|---|---|---|---|---|---|---|
| No. 7 North Dakota $^ | 7 | – | 0 | 12 | – | 2 |
| No. 23 North Dakota State | 5 | – | 2 | 8 | – | 3 |
| No. 24 Nebraska–Omaha | 5 | – | 2 | 8 | – | 3 |
| South Dakota State | 4 | – | 3 | 7 | – | 4 |
| St. Cloud State | 4 | – | 3 | 7 | – | 4 |
| South Dakota | 2 | – | 5 | 5 | – | 6 |
| Augustana (SD) | 1 | – | 6 | 3 | – | 8 |
| Minnesota State | 0 | – | 7 | 0 | – | 11 |
$ – Conference champion; ^ – NCAA Division II playoff participant; Rankings from AFCA Poll

The 2003 North Dakota Fighting Sioux football team represented the University of North Dakota (UND) in the 2003 NCAA Division II football season. In Dale Lennon's fifth year as head coach, the team compiled a record of 12–2 overall and won the North Central Conference (NCC) title with a 7–0 mark. North Dakota was led on offense by two quarterbacks in Jon Bowenkamp and Joe Wilson, running back Adam Roland, and receivers Dan Grossman and Team-Voted MVP Willis Stattelman. Co-captain Digger Anderson was the leading tackler on defense. North Dakota lost to Grand Valley State in the final of the NCAA Division II Football Championship, a reverse of the 2001 result.

== Schedule ==
| Date | Opponent | Rank | Site | Result | Attendance | Source |
|---|---|---|---|---|---|---|
| September 6 | Minnesota–Crookston* | | Alerus Center; Grand Forks, ND | W 59–0 | | |
| September 13 | at Mesa State* | | Ralph Stocker Stadium; Grand Junction, CO | L 24–31 ^{OT} | | |
| September 20 | Newberry* | | Alerus Center; Grand Forks, ND | W 42–23 | | |
| September 27 | Augustana (SD)^{†} | | Alerus Center; Grand Forks, ND | W 13–3 | | |
| October 4 | St. Cloud State | | Alerus Center; Grand Forks, ND | W 29–28 | | |
| October 11 | at South Dakota State | | Coughlin–Alumni Stadium; Brookings, SD | W 25–24 | | |
| October 18 | North Dakota State | | Alerus Center; Grand Forks, ND (Nickel Trophy) | W 28–21 ^{OT} | 12,267 | |
| October 25 | at Minnesota State | | Blakeslee Stadium; Mankato, MN | W 41–25 | | |
| November 1 | Nebraska–Omaha | | Alerus Center; Grand Forks, ND | W 38–35 | | |
| November 8 | at South Dakota | | DakotaDome; Vermillion, SD (Sitting Bull Trophy) | W 37–3 | | |
| November 22 | Pittsburg State* | | Alerus Center; Grand Forks, ND (NCAA Division II First Round) | W 24–14 | 7,160 | |
| November 29 | Winona State* | | Alerus Center; Grand Forks, ND (NCAA Division II Quarterfinal) | W 36–29 | | |
| December 6 | North Alabama* | | Alerus Center; Grand Forks, ND (NCAA Division II Semifinal) | W 29–22 | 9,652 | |
| December 13 | vs. No. 4 Grand Valley State* | No. 7 | Braly Municipal Stadium; Florence, AL (NCAA Division II Championship Game) | L 3–10 | 7,236 | |
*Non-conference game; ^{†}Homecoming; Rankings from Coaches' Poll released prior to the game

== Game summaries ==
=== Minnesota–Crookston ===
In the season opener against the Minnesota–Crookston Eagles the Sioux dominated. They scored forty-two second-quarter points and six players scored as they won fifty-nine to nothing.

=== At Mesa State ===
The Sioux stumbled at Mesa St. The Mavs took an early twenty-one–to–seven lead and took that led into halftime. UND fought back and got within seventeen to twenty-four. Finally with eighteen seconds left Adam Roland ran through for a one-yard touchdown to send the game to overtime. However, the Sioux could not score in overtime as they lost thirty-one to twenty-four.

=== Newberry ===
In the third game of the season the Sioux tore apart the Newberry Indians. UND dominated early and often and the Indians could not stop the Sioux and took a forty-two–to–nine fourth quarter lead. The Indians did score two touchdowns to make it respectable as the Sioux won forty-two to twenty-three.

=== Augustana (SD) ===
In the 2003 homecoming game UND battled the Augustana Vikings. In the first quarter Travis Lueck returned a blocked punt fifty-one yards to give the Sioux a six-to-nothing lead. After Augustana made it six to three in the fourth quarter the Sioux put it away as Dan Grossman scored on a thirty-six-yard pass from Jon Bowenkamp and UND won thirteen to three.

=== St. Cloud State ===
The next week against the St. Cloud State Huskies UND came out flatter than water. St. Cloud took a twenty-eight–to–three halftime lead. At halftime UND coach Dale Lennon switched quarterbacks putting in sixth-year senior Joe Wilson. The first play of the second half Brandon Strouth threw a sixty-one-yard pass to Willis Stattelman on a halfback pass. Willis Stattelman scored two more fourth quarter touchdowns and got within twenty-eight to twenty-six. As time ran out the Sioux had one chance as kicker Jeff Glas attempted a fifty-two yard field goal. The kick went through, giving the Sioux the improbable win.

=== At South Dakota State ===
When UND went to South Dakota St., the Sioux faced similar difficulties falling, behind twenty-one to three at halftime. At halftime Dale Lennon undid the previous week's quarterback switch, putting Jon Bowenkamp back in. With six minutes left Bowenkamp found Jesse Ahlers in the end zone to make it twenty-four to seventeen. Then with two seconds left Bowenkamp found Ahlers in the end zone again for a ten-yard touchdown. The Sioux chose to go for the win. Bowenkamp went back to pass and fired the ball in the end zone, the ball was tipped and Willis Stattelman sprawled out to catch the ball and give UND the win.

=== North Dakota State ===
The next week UND went to play the NDSU Bison, their instate rival in the final Nickel Trophy game as the Bison were going up to Division I-AA. With under ten minutes left in the fourth quarter Travis Lueck caught his second touchdown of over fifty yards to give UND a twenty-one–to–seven lead. NDSU would then come back and tie the game with ten seconds left in regulation. In overtime after a Caleb Johnson touchdown NDSU had to score and had a third down and one when Digger Anderson made a key stop and then made a fourth down stop to give the win to the Sioux.

=== At Minnesota State–Mankato ===
The next week at Mankato the Sioux ran away from the Mavs as Aaron Schwenzfeier ran for one hundred forty-three yards and Travis Lueck had one hundred thirty-five yards receiving in the forty-one to twenty-five win.

=== Nebraska–Omaha ===
In this game UND would blow a thirty-five to twenty-one lead. After UNO tied the game at thirty-five UND got the ball with two minutes left. Travis Lueck followed the ball early in the drive and the Mavs went for a field goal attempt. The kick was shanked though giving UND a final chance. The Sioux were led down the field by Jon Bowenkamp and finished off as Jeff Glas kicked a game winning forty-eight-yard field goal.

=== At South Dakota ===
In the season finale UND ran away from the Coyotes led by Roland's ninety-eight yards rushing and Jesse Ahlers one hundred forty-three receiving yards as UND won thirty-seven to three.

=== Pittsburg State ===
In the playoff opener UND shut down the Gorillas. Adam Roland ran for one hundred sixty-eight yards and Dan Grossman scored a touchdown from Joe Wilson as UND won twenty-four to fourteen.

=== Winona State ===
In the quarterfinals the Sioux dominated the second quarter against the Warriors taking a twenty-eight–to–seven lead. The Warriors came back though and took a twenty-nine to twenty-eight fourth quarter lead. With twenty-four second left Adam Roland punched in a one-yard touchdown that was set up by several Willis Stattelman catches. The win sent UND to the Semi finals.

=== North Alabama ===
The Sioux shut down the Lions no huddle offense at home as the Lions could not here in the Alerus Center. UND jumped to a nineteen-to-three halftime lead. North Alabama came back but the Sioux won twenty-nine to twenty-two victory.

=== Grand Valley State ===
The season came down to the 2001 national championship game rematch as the Grand Valley St. Lakers took on the North Dakota Fighting Sioux. UND could not do anything and Jeff Glas missed three field goals. Down ten to three, the Sioux had one final chance near the goal line. Jon Bowenkamp was looking for Stattlemen in the end zone but the pass was picked off and Grand Valley finished off the repeat.
