= 2003 North Dakota State Bison football team =

American college football season

2003 North Dakota State Bison football
- Conference: North Central Conference

Ranking
- AFCA: No. 23
- Record: 8–3 (5–2 NCC)
- Head coach: Craig Bohl (1st season)
- Offensive coordinator: Dan Enos (1st season)
- Offensive scheme: West Coast
- Defensive coordinator: Jim Burrow (1st season)
- Base defense: 4–3
- Home stadium: Fargodome

2003 North Central Conference football standings
	Conf.			Overall
Team	W		L	W		L
No. 7 North Dakota $^	7	–	0	12	–	2
No. 23 North Dakota State	5	–	2	8	–	3
No. 24 Nebraska–Omaha	5	–	2	8	–	3
South Dakota State	4	–	3	7	–	4
St. Cloud State	4	–	3	7	–	4
South Dakota	2	–	5	5	–	6
Augustana (SD)	1	–	6	3	–	8
Minnesota State	0	–	7	0	–	11
$ – Conference champion; ^ – NCAA Division II playoff participant; Rankings from AFCA Poll

The 2003 North Dakota State Bison football team was an American football team that represented North Dakota State University during the 2003 NCAA Division II football season as a member of the North Central Conference. In their first year under head coach Craig Bohl, the team compiled an 8–3 record.

This was the Bison's final season competing as a Division II program.

== Schedule ==
Date	Opponent	Rank	Site	Result	Attendance	Source
August 30	Tusculum*		Fargodome; Fargo, ND	W 28–7	10,581	
September 6	at No. 3 (I-AA) Montana*		Washington–Grizzly Stadium; Missoula, MT	W 25–24	23,102	
September 13	UC Davis*	No. 20	Fargodome; Fargo, ND	L 14–23	14,548	
September 27	South Dakota State	No. 22	Fargodome; Fargo, ND (rivalry)	W 24–0	14,108	
October 4	at Minnesota State	No. 18	Blakeslee Stadium; Mankato, MN	W 20–9	3,781	
October 11	No. 8 Nebraska–Omaha^{†}	No. 12	Fargodome; Fargo, ND	W 34–7	14,109	
October 18	at No. 12 North Dakota	No. 8	Alerus Center; Grand Forks, ND (Nickel Trophy)	L 21–28 ^{OT}	12,267	
October 25	at Augustana (SD)	No. 16	Howard Wood Field; Sioux Falls, SD	W 42–10	1,656	
November 1	South Dakota	No. 17	Fargodome; Fargo, ND	W 35–3	9,010	
November 8	at St. Cloud State	No. 16	Selke Field; St. Cloud, MN	L 30–33 ^{OT}	4,218	
November 15	Concordia (MN)*	No. 23	Fargodome; Fargo, ND	W 58–24	7,045	
*Non-conference game; ^{†}Homecoming; Rankings from NCAA Division II Football Committee Poll released prior to the game
