= 2004 NCAA Division II football rankings =

The 2004 NCAA Division II football rankings are from the American Football Coaches Association (AFCA). This is for the 2004 season.

== Legend ==
	Increase in ranking
	Decrease in ranking
	Not ranked previous week
(#–#)	Win–loss record
(Italics)	Number of first place votes
т	Tied with team above or below also with this symbol

== American Football Coaches Association poll ==
	Preseason (Note: Although one was published, no preseason poll has been found. 23 of the 25 rankings are known, based on the first regular season poll.)	Week 1 Sept 8	Week 2 Sept 15	Week 3 Sept 22	Week 4 Sept 29	Week 5 Oct 6	Week 6 Oct 13	Week 7 Oct 20	Week 8 Oct 27	Week 9 Nov 3	Week 10 Nov 10	Week 11 Postseason	
1.	Grand Valley State	Grand Valley State (2–0) (24)	Grand Valley State (3–0) (24)	Grand Valley State (4–0) (25)	Grand Valley State (4–0) (25)	Grand Valley State (5–0) (24)	Grand Valley State (6–0) (24)	Pittsburg State (8–0) (23)	Pittsburg State (9–0) (23)	Pittsburg State (10–0) (24)	Pittsburg State (11–0) (25)	Valdosta State (13–1) (25)	1.
2.	North Dakota	North Dakota (2–0) (1)	North Dakota (3–0) (1)	North Dakota (3–0)	North Dakota (4–0)	Pittsburg State (6–0) (1)	Pittsburg State (7–0) (1)	Texas A&M–Kingsville (6–0) (2)	Texas A&M–Kingsville (7–0) (2)	Northwest Missouri State (10–0) (1)	Albany State (10–0)	Pittsburg State (14–1)	2.
3.	Valdosta State	Carson–Newman (2–0)	Carson–Newman (2–0)	Pittsburg State (4–0)	Pittsburg State (5–0)	Texas A&M–Kingsville (4–0)	Texas A&M–Kingsville (5–0)	Northwest Missouri State (8–0)	Northwest Missouri State (9–0)	Albany State (9–0)	Valdosta State (9–1)	Northwest Missouri State (11–2)	3.
4.	Texas A&M–Kingsville	Pittsburg State (2–0)	Pittsburg State (3–0)	Texas A&M–Kingsville (2–0)	Texas A&M–Kingsville (3–0)	Northwest Missouri State (6–0)	Northwest Missouri State (7–0)	Albany State (7–0)	Albany State (8–0)	Michigan Tech (9–0)	Northwest Missouri State (10–1)	North Dakota (11–3)	4.
5.	Carson–Newman	Texas A&M–Kingsville (1–0)	Texas A&M–Kingsville (2–0)	Northwest Missouri State (4–0)	Northwest Missouri State (5–0)	Catawba (5–0)	Albany State (6–0)	Valdosta State (6–1)	Valdosta State (7–1)	Valdosta State (8–1)	Colorado Mines (11–0)	Albany State (11–1)	5.
6.	Pittsburg State	North Alabama (1–0)	North Alabama (2–0)	Catawba (3–0)	Catawba (4–0)	Central Oklahoma (6–0)	St. Cloud State (7–0)	North Dakota (6–1)	North Dakota (7–1)	Arkansas Tech (9–0)	Texas A&M–Kingsville (8–1)	Texas A&M–Kingsville (9–2)	6.
7.	North Alabama	Tarleton State (2–0)	Tarleton State (3–0)	Central Oklahoma (4–0)	Central Oklahoma (5–0)	Albany State (5–0)	Northwood (7–0)	East Stroudsburg (7–0)	Michigan Tech (8–0)	South Dakota (9–1)	Northwood (10–1)	West Chester (11–4)	7.
8.	Tarleton State	Central Missouri State (2–0)	Northwest Missouri State (3–0)	Albany State (4–0)	Albany State (4–0)	St. Cloud State (6–0)	Valdosta State (5–1)	Michigan Tech (7–0)	Arkansas Tech (8–0)	Colorado Mines (10–0)	Winona State (10–1)	Colorado Mines (12–1)	8.
9.	Central Missouri State	IUP (2–0)	Catawba (3–0)	Carson–Newman (2–1)	Shippensburg (5–0)	Carson–Newman (4–1)	North Dakota (5–1)	Arkansas Tech (7–0)	Central Oklahoma (7–1)	Texas A&M–Kingsville (7–1)	Michigan Tech (9–1)	Grand Valley State (10–3)	9.
10.	Central Oklahoma	Central Oklahoma (2–0)	Central Oklahoma (3–0)	Shippensburg (4–0)	Carson–Newman (3–1)	Valdosta State (4–1)	East Stroudsburg (6–0)	Grand Valley State (6–1)	South Dakota (8–1)	Winona State (9–1)	Shippensburg (10–1)	Northwood (10–2)	10.
11.	Nebraska–Omaha	Northwest Missouri State (2–0)	Albany State (3–0)	Delta State (2–1)	Delta State (3–1)	North Dakota (4–1)	Central Oklahoma (6–1)	Central Oklahoma (7–1)	Winona State (8–1)	Northwood (9–1)	East Stroudsburg (9–1)	Michigan Tech (9–2)	11.
12.	Tusculum	Catawba (2–0)	Shippensburg (3–0)	Valdosta State (2–1)	Valdosta State (3–1)	Northwood (6–0)	Arkansas Tech (6–0)	Catawba (6–1)	Colorado Mines (9–0)	Shippensburg (9–1)	Arkansas Tech (9–1)	East Stroudsburg (10–2)	12.
13.	IUP (Note: In the actual printed polls, IUP was listed as Indiana (PA))	Albany State (2–0)	Valdosta State (1–1)	Saginaw Valley State (2–1)	Saginaw Valley State (3–1)	Saginaw Valley State (4–1)	Michigan Tech (6–0)	South Dakota (7–1)	Northwood (8–1)	East Stroudsburg (8–1)	Carson–Newman (8–2)	Winona State (10–2)	13.
14.	Northwest Missouri State	Winona State (2–0)	Saginaw Valley State (1–1)	North Alabama (2–1)	Northwood (5–0)	East Stroudsburg (5–0)	Catawba (5–1)	Winona State (7–1)	Shippensburg (8–1)	Carson–Newman (7–2)	North Dakota (8–2)	Carson–Newman (9–3)	14.
15.	Catawba	Valdosta State (0–1)	Central Missouri State (2–1)	Northwood (4–0)	St. Cloud State (5–0)	Arkansas Tech (5–0)	Winona State (6–1)	Colorado Mines (8–0)	East Stroudsburg (7–1)	Nebraska–Omaha (8–2)	Grand Valley State (8–2)	Shippensburg (10–2)	15.
16.	Delta State	Shippensburg (2–0)	Delta State (1–1)	Central Missouri State (3–1)	Central Missouri State (4–1)	Winona State (5–1)	Colorado Mines (7–0)	St. Cloud State (7–1)	Saginaw Valley State (6–2)	North Dakota (7–2)	South Dakota (9–2)	Arkansas Tech (10–2)	16.
17.	Winona State	Saginaw Valley State (0–1)	Northwood (3–0)	St. Cloud State (4–0)	Tuskegee (3–0)	Michigan Tech (5–0)	Shippensburg (6–1)	Shippensburg (7–1)	Wingate (8–1)	Grand Valley State (7–2)	St. Cloud State (8–2)	St. Cloud State (8–3)	17.
18.	Saginaw Valley State	Bloomsburg (1–0)	IUP (2–1)	Tarleton State (3–1)	East Stroudsburg (4–0)	Shippensburg (5–1)	South Dakota (6–1)	Northwood (7–1)	Carson–Newman (6–2)	Tuskegee (7–1)	Tuskegee (8–1)	Edinboro (9–3)	18.
19.	Shippensburg	Delta State (0–1)	St. Cloud State (3–0)	Central Arkansas (4–0)	Winona State (4–1)	Colorado Mines (6–0)	Wingate (6–1)	Saginaw Valley State (5–2)	Grand Valley State (6–2)	Central Oklahoma (7–2)	Central Oklahoma (8–2)	South Dakota (9–2)	19.
20.	Bloomsburg	Southern Arkansas (2–0)	Tuskegee (3–0)	IUP (2–1)	Central Arkansas (4–1)	Delta State (3–2)	Tuskegee (4–1)	Wingate (7–1)	Tuskegee (6–1)	St. Cloud State (7–2)	Bentley (8–1)	Bentley (8–2)	20.
21.		Northwood (2–0)	Winona State (2–1)	Tuskegee (3–0)	Arkansas Tech (4–0)	Tuskegee (3–1)	Carson–Newman (4–2)	Carson–Newman (5–2)	Nebraska–Omaha (7–2)	West Chester (8–2)	Edinboro (8–2)	Central Oklahoma (8–2)	21.
22.	Albany State	Nebraska–Omaha (1–1)	Central Arkansas (3–0)	Winona State (3–1)	Michigan Tech (4–0)	South Dakota (5–1)	North Alabama (4–2)	Tuskegee (5–1)	Catawba (6–2)	Wingate (8–2)	Saginaw Valley State (7–3)	Tuskegee (10–2)	22.
23.		Tusculum (1–1)	Nebraska–Omaha (2–1)	East Stroudsburg (3–0)	Wingate (5–0)	Central Missouri State (4–2)	Saginaw Valley State (4–2)	North Alabama (5–2)	Central Arkansas (7–2)	Bentley (8–1)	West Chester (8–3)	Southeastern Oklahoma State (8–3)	23.
24.	Southern Arkansas	Tuskegee (2–0)	Tusculum (2–1)	Tusculum (2–1)	Colorado Mines (5–0) (Note: In the actual printed polls, Colorado Mines was listed as Colorado School of Mines)	North Alabama (3–2)	Midwestern State (5–1)	Central Arkansas (6–2)	St. Cloud State (7–2)	Edinboro (7–2)	Nebraska–Omaha (8–3)	Nebraska–Omaha (8–3)	24.
25.	Northwood	St. Cloud State (2–0) (Note: In some of the actual printed polls, Saint Cloud State was incorrectly listed as State Cloud State)	East Stroudsburg (3–0)	South Dakota (4–0)	South Dakota (4–1)	California (PA) (4–1)	Central Arkansas (5–2)	Nebraska–Omaha (6–2)	West Chester (7–2)	Saginaw Valley State (6–3)	Southeastern Oklahoma State (8–2)	Saginaw Valley State (7–3)	25.
	Preseason (Note: Although one was published, no preseason poll has been found. 23 of the 25 rankings are known, based on the first regular season poll.)	Week 1 Sept 8	Week 2 Sept 15	Week 3 Sept 22	Week 4 Sept 29	Week 5 Oct 6	Week 6 Oct 13	Week 7 Oct 20	Week 8 Oct 27	Week 9 Nov 3	Week 10 Nov 10	Week 11 Postseason	
		Dropped: 21; 23	Dropped: 18 Bloomsburg; 20 Southern Arkansas	Dropped: 23 Nebraska–Omaha	Dropped: 14 North Alabama; 18 Tarleton State; 20 IUP; 24 Tusculum	Dropped: 20 Central Arkansas; 23 Wingate	Dropped: 20 Delta State; 23 Central Missouri State; 25 California (PA)	Dropped: 24 Midwestern State	Dropped: 23 North Alabama	Dropped: 22 Catawba; 23 Central Arkansas	Dropped: 22 Wingate	None	
