= 2004 NCAA Division II football season =

American college football season

- Regular season: August 26 – November 6, 2004
- Playoffs: November 13 – December 11, 2004
- National Championship: Braly Municipal Stadium; Florence, AL
- Champion: Valdosta State
- Harlon Hill Trophy: Chad Friehauf, Colorado Mines

The 2004 NCAA Division II football season, part of college football in the United States organized by the National Collegiate Athletic Association at the Division II level, began on August 26, 2004, and concluded with the NCAA Division II Football Championship on December 11, 2004, at Braly Municipal Stadium in Florence, Alabama, hosted by the University of North Alabama. The Valdosta State Blazers defeated the Pittsburg State Gorillas, 36–31, to win their first Division II national title.

The Harlon Hill Trophy was awarded to Chad Friehauf, quarterback from Colorado Mines.

== Conference changes and new programs ==
School	Former conference	New conference
Gannon	Independent	GLIAC
Kentucky Wesleyan	Independent	Mid-South (NAIA)
Minnesota–Duluth	NSIC	NCC
New Haven	Independent	Dropped program
Northern Colorado	Independent	Great West (I-AA)
North Dakota State	NCC	Great West (I-AA)
South Dakota State	NCC	Great West (I-AA)
Stillman	Independent (D-III)	Independent (D-II)
Upper Iowa	IIAC (D-III)	Independent (D-II)

=== Regional realignment ===
The South Region was renamed the Southeast Region but stayed the same, while the Northeast Region lost the GLIAC. The West Region lost the GNAC, gained the MIAA, and became the Southwest Region. The new Northwest Region contained the GLIAC and GNAC, plus the NCC and NSIC from the former Midwest Region.

== Conference standings ==
=== Northeast Region ===
2004 Northeast-10 Conference football standings
	Conf.			Overall
Team	W		L	W		L
No. 20 Bentley +^	8	–	1	8	–	2
C. W. Post +^	8	–	1	8	–	3
Southern Connecticut	7	–	2	8	–	2
Merrimack	7	–	2	8	–	2
American International	5	–	4	5	–	4
Bryant	4	–	5	4	–	5
Saint Anselm	3	–	6	4	–	6
Stonehill	2	–	7	2	–	7
Assumption	1	–	8	1	–	9
Pace	0	–	9	0	–	10
+ – Conference co-champions; ^ – NCAA Division II playoff participant; Rankings from AFCA poll

2004 Pennsylvania State Athletic Conference football standings
	Conf.			Overall
Team	W		L	W		L
East
No. 7 West Chester x^	6	–	0	11	–	4
No. 12 East Stroudsburg ^	5	–	1	10	–	2
Bloomsburg	4	–	2	7	–	3
Millersville	3	–	3	5	–	5
Kutztown	2	–	4	4	–	6
Mansfield	1	–	5	1	–	9
Cheyney	0	–	6	1	–	10
West
No. 15 Shippensburg x^	5	–	1	10	–	2
No. 18 Edinboro x^	5	–	1	9	–	3
IUP x	5	–	1	7	–	3
California (PA)	2	–	4	6	–	4
Slippery Rock	2	–	4	4	–	7
Clarion	1	–	5	3	–	8
Lock Haven	1	–	5	3	–	8
x – Division champion/co-champions; ^ – NCAA Division II playoff participant; Rankings from AFCA poll

2004 West Virginia Intercollegiate Athletic Conference football standings
	Conf.			Overall
Team	W		L	W		L
Shepherd $	7	–	0	7	–	3
Glenville State	5	–	2	5	–	6
West Virginia Wesleyan	4	–	3	6	–	5
Fairmont State	4	–	3	5	–	5
Concord	4	–	3	5	–	6
West Virginia State	2	–	5	3	–	8
West Virginia Tech	2	–	5	2	–	9
West Liberty State	0	–	7	2	–	8
$ – Conference champion

2004 NCAA Division II Northeast Region independents football records
	Conf.			Overall
Team	W		L	W		L
Charleston (WV)		–		3	–	7

=== Southeast Region ===
2004 Central Intercollegiate Athletic Association football standings
	Conf.			Overall
Team	W		L	W		L
Eastern Division
Shaw # xy$	5	–	2	10	–	2
Bowie State	4	–	3	5	–	5
Virginia State	3	–	4	6	–	4
Virginia Union	2	–	5	2	–	8
Elizabeth City State	2	–	5	3	–	7
Western Division
Fayetteville State xy^	6	–	1	8	–	4
North Carolina Central x	6	–	1	8	–	2
Winston-Salem State	4	–	3	4	–	6
Livingstone	2	–	5	2	–	8
St. Augustine's @	0	–	4	0	–	6
Johnson C. Smith	0	–	7	0	–	10
Championship: Shaw 10, Fayetteville State 7
$ – Conference champion; x – Division champion/co-champions; y – Championship game participant; ^ – NCAA Division II playoff participant; # – Pioneer Bowl participant @ – St. Augustine's vacated 4 wins including 3 in conference play.

2004 Gulf South Conference football standings
	Conf.			Overall
Team	W		L	W		L
No. 1 Valdosta State $^	9	–	0	13	–	1
No. 16 Arkansas Tech ^	8	–	1	10	–	2
Central Arkansas	6	–	3	8	–	3
Delta State	6	–	3	6	–	4
Arkansas–Monticello	5	–	4	6	–	5
Harding	4	–	5	6	–	5
North Alabama	4	–	5	5	–	5
Southern Arkansas	3	–	6	5	–	6
West Georgia	2	–	6	2	–	7
Ouachita Baptist	2	–	6	2	–	7
Henderson State	2	–	7	2	–	8
West Alabama	2	–	7	2	–	9
$ – Conference champion; ^ – NCAA Division II playoff participant; Rankings from AFCA poll

2004 South Atlantic Conference football standings
	Conf.			Overall
Team	W		L	W		L
No. 14 Carson–Newman $^	6	–	1	9	–	3
Wingate	4	–	3	8	–	3
Catawba ^	4	–	3	7	–	4
Tusculum	4	–	3	6	–	4
Presbyterian	4	–	3	6	–	5
Mars Hill	3	–	4	6	–	4
Lenoir–Rhyne	2	–	5	3	–	8
Newberry	1	–	6	5	–	6
$ – Conference champion; ^ – NCAA Division II playoff participant; Rankings from AFCA poll

2004 Southern Intercollegiate Athletic Conference football standings
	Conf.			Overall
Team	W		L	W		L
No. 5 Albany State $^	8	–	0	11	–	1
No. 22 Tuskegee	7	–	1	10	–	2
Miles	6	–	2	7	–	3
Kentucky State	5	–	3	7	–	4
Fort Valley State	4	–	4	7	–	4
Morehouse	3	–	5	4	–	6
Benedict	2	–	6	3	–	8
Clark Atlanta	1	–	7	1	–	9
Lane	0	–	8	2	–	9
+ – Conference co-champions; ^ – NCAA Division II playoff participant; Rankings from AFCA poll

2004 NCAA Division II Southeast Region independents football records
	Conf.			Overall
Team	W		L	W		L
Stillman #		–		5	–	5
North Greenville		–		3	–	7
# – Provisional NCAA Division II member

=== Northwest Region ===
2004 Great Lakes Intercollegiate Athletic Conference football standings
	Conf.			Overall
Team	W		L	W		L
No. 10 Northwood +^	9	–	1	10	–	2
No. 11 Michigan Tech +^	9	–	1	9	–	2
No. 9 Grand Valley State ^	8	–	2	10	–	3
No. 25 Saginaw Valley State	7	–	3	7	–	3
Ferris State	6	–	4	6	–	5
Findlay	5	–	5	6	–	5
Ashland	4	–	6	5	–	6
Hillsdale	4	–	6	4	–	7
Mercyhurst	4	–	6	4	–	7
Gannon	3	–	7	4	–	7
Indianapolis	3	–	7	4	–	7
Northern Michigan	2	–	8	2	–	8
Wayne State (MI)	1	–	9	1	–	9
+ – Conference co-champions; ^ – NCAA Division II playoff participant; Rankings from AFCA poll

2004 Great Northwest Athletic Conference football standings
	Conf.			Overall
Team	W		L	W		L
Central Washington $	5	–	1	7	–	4
Western Washington	3	–	3	6	–	4
Humboldt State	3	–	3	5	–	5
Western Oregon	1	–	5	1	–	9
$ – Conference champion

2004 North Central Conference football standings
	Conf.			Overall
Team	W		L	W		L
No. 24 Nebraska–Omaha $	5	–	1	8	–	3
No. 19 South Dakota	4	–	2	9	–	2
No. 4 North Dakota ^	4	–	2	11	–	3
No. 17 St. Cloud State ^	4	–	2	8	–	3
Minnesota State	3	–	3	6	–	5
Minnesota–Duluth	1	–	5	4	–	7
Augustana (SD)	0	–	6	3	–	8
$ – Conference champion; ^ – NCAA Division II playoff participant; Rankings from AFCA Poll

2004 Northern Sun Intercollegiate Conference football standings
	Conf.			Overall
Team	W		L	W		L
No. 13 Winona State $^	7	–	0	10	–	2
Bemidji State	5	–	2	8	–	3
Northern State #	5	–	2	6	–	5
Concordia–St. Paul	4	–	3	7	–	4
SW Minnesota State	3	–	4	5	–	6
Minnesota–Crookston	2	–	5	2	–	8
Wayne State (NE)	2	–	5	3	–	8
Minnesota State–Moorhead	0	–	7	0	–	11
$ – Conference champion; ^ – NCAA Division II playoff participant; # – Mineral Water Bowl participant; Rankings from AFCA poll

2004 NCAA Division II Northwest Region independents football records
	Conf.			Overall
Team	W		L	W		L
Saint Joseph's (IN)		–		7	–	4
Tiffin		–		5	–	6
Upper Iowa #		–		2	–	8
# – Provisional NCAA Division II member

=== Southwest Region ===
2004 Lone Star Conference football standings
	Conf.			Overall
Team	W		L	W		L
Overall*
No. 6 Texas A&M–Kingsville $^	8	–	1	9	–	2
No. 23 SE Oklahoma State ^	7	–	2	8	–	3
No. 21 Central Oklahoma	7	–	2	8	–	2
Midwestern State ^	7	–	2	8	–	3
Tarleton State	6	–	3	7	–	4
Abilene Christian	5	–	4	5	–	5
East Central	5	–	4	6	–	4
Eastern New Mexico	5	–	4	6	–	5
Texas A&M–Commerce	4	–	5	4	–	6
Angelo State	2	–	7	2	–	9
West Texas A&M	2	–	7	2	–	8
SW Oklahoma State	1	–	8	1	–	9
Northeastern State	0	–	9	0	–	10
North Division
No. 21 Central Oklahoma x	4	–	1	8	–	2
No. 23 SE Oklahoma State x^	4	–	1	8	–	3
Tarleton State	3	–	2	7	–	4
East Central	3	–	2	6	–	4
SW Oklahoma State	1	–	4	1	–	9
Northeastern State	0	–	5	0	–	10
South Division
No. 6 Texas A&M–Kingsville x$^	5	–	1	9	–	2
Midwestern State x^	5	–	1	8	–	3
Eastern New Mexico	4	–	2	6	–	5
Abilene Christian	3	–	3	5	–	5
Texas A&M–Commerce	2	–	4	4	–	6
West Texas A&M	1	–	5	2	–	8
Angelo State	1	–	5	2	–	9
$ – Conference champion; ^ – NCAA Division II playoff participant; * – The LSC counted separate overall and division standings.; Rankings from AFCA Poll

2004 Mid-America Intercollegiate Athletics Association football standings
	Conf.			Overall
Team	W		L	W		L
No. 2 Pittsburg State $^	9	–	0	14	–	1
No. 3 NW Missouri State ^	8	–	1	11	–	2
Washburn #	6	–	3	8	–	4
Central Missouri State	5	–	4	7	–	4
Emporia State	4	–	5	5	–	6
Missouri Southern	4	–	5	5	–	6
Missouri Western	4	–	5	5	–	6
Missouri–Rolla	2	–	7	3	–	8
Truman	2	–	7	2	–	9
Southwest Baptist	1	–	8	2	–	9
$ – Conference champion; ^ – NCAA Division II playoff participant; # – Mineral Water Bowl participant; Rankings from AFCA poll

2004 Rocky Mountain Athletic Conference football standings
	Conf.			Overall
Team	W		L	W		L
No. 8 Colorado Mines $^	8	–	0	12	–	1
Chadron State	6	–	2	7	–	3
Adams State	6	–	2	7	–	4
Fort Hays State	5	–	3	6	–	5
Nebraska–Kearney	4	–	4	5	–	6
Fort Lewis	3	–	5	4	–	6
New Mexico Highlands	2	–	6	3	–	8
Western State (CO)	2	–	6	3	–	8
Mesa State	0	–	8	0	–	11
$ – Conference champion; ^ – NCAA Division II playoff participant; Rankings from AFCA poll

2004 NCAA Division II Southwest Region independents football records
	Conf.			Overall
Team	W		L	W		L
OK Panhandle State		–		6	–	5
Western New Mexico		–		2	–	8
Lincoln (MO)		–		1	–	9

== Conference summaries ==
Conference Champions

Central Intercollegiate Athletic Association – Shaw
Great Lakes Intercollegiate Athletic Conference – Michigan Tech and Northwood
Great Northwest Athletic Conference – Central Washington
Gulf South Conference – Valdosta State
Lone Star Conference – Texas A&M–Kingsville
Mid-America Intercollegiate Athletics Association – Pittsburg State
North Central Conference – Nebraska–Omaha
Northeast-10 Conference – Bentley and C.W. Post
Northern Sun Intercollegiate Conference – Winona State
Pennsylvania State Athletic Conference – West Chester (East), Edinboro, Indiana (PA), and Shippensburg (West)
Rocky Mountain Athletic Conference – Colorado Mines
South Atlantic Conference – Carson-Newman
Southern Intercollegiate Athletic Conference – Albany State
West Virginia Intercollegiate Athletic Conference – Shepherd

== Postseason ==
2004 NCAA Division II Football Championship
- Teams: 24
- Finals Site: Braly Municipal Stadium; Florence, AL
- Champion: Valdosta State; (1st title, title game)
- Runner-up: Pittsburg State; (4th title game)
- Semifinalists: North Dakota; West Chester
- Winning coach: championship

The 2004 NCAA Division II Football Championship playoffs were the 31st single-elimination tournament to determine the national champion of men's NCAA Division II college football. The championship game was held at Braly Municipal Stadium in Florence, Alabama for the 17th time. This was the first year of a 24-team playoff bracket.

=== Seeded teams ===
- Albany State
- East Stroudsburg
- Michigan Tech
- Northwest Missouri State
- Northwood
- Pittsburg State
- Shippensburg
- Valdosta State

=== Playoff bracket ===
First round November 13; Campus Sites	Second round November 20; Campus Sites
1	Michigan Tech*	3
5	North Dakota	20
5	North Dakota††	20
4	St. Cloud State	17
Super Region 3
2	Northwood*	7
6	Grand Valley State	10
6	Grand Valley State	16
3	Winona State	13
1	Pittsburg State*	70
4	Colorado Mines	35
4	Colorado Mines	52
5	Midwestern State	33
Super Region 4
2	Northwest Missouri State*	34
3	Texas A&M–Kingsville	14
3	Texas A&M–Kingsville	40
6	SE Oklahoma State	30
1	Shippensburg	28
4	West Chester	33
4	West Chester	35
5	C.W. Post	3
Super Region 1
2	East Stroudsburg*	36
6	Edinboro	32
6	Edinboro	47
3	Bentley	44
1	Albany State*	42
4	Arkansas Tech	24
4	Arkansas Tech	24
5	Catawba	20
Super Region 2
2	Valdosta State*	38
3	Carson–Newman	12
3	Carson–Newman	35
6	Fayetteville State	14

Quarterfinals; November 27; Campus Sites
5	North Dakota	19
6	Grand Valley State	15
1	Pittsburg State	50
2	Northwest Missouri State	36
4	West Chester	48
2	East Stroudsburg	38
1	Albany State (GA)	24
2	Valdosta State	38

Semifinals; December 4 Campus Sites
5	North Dakota	19
1	Pittsburg State	31
4	West Chester	21
2	Valdosta State	45

National Championship Game; December 11; Braly Municipal Stadium, Florence, Alabama
1	Pittsburg State	31
2	Valdosta State	36

* Home team † Overtime

== See also ==
- 2004 NCAA Division I-A football season
- 2004 NCAA Division I-AA football season
- 2004 NCAA Division III football season
- 2004 NAIA football season
