= Albany State University Coliseum =

American football stadium in Albany, Georgia

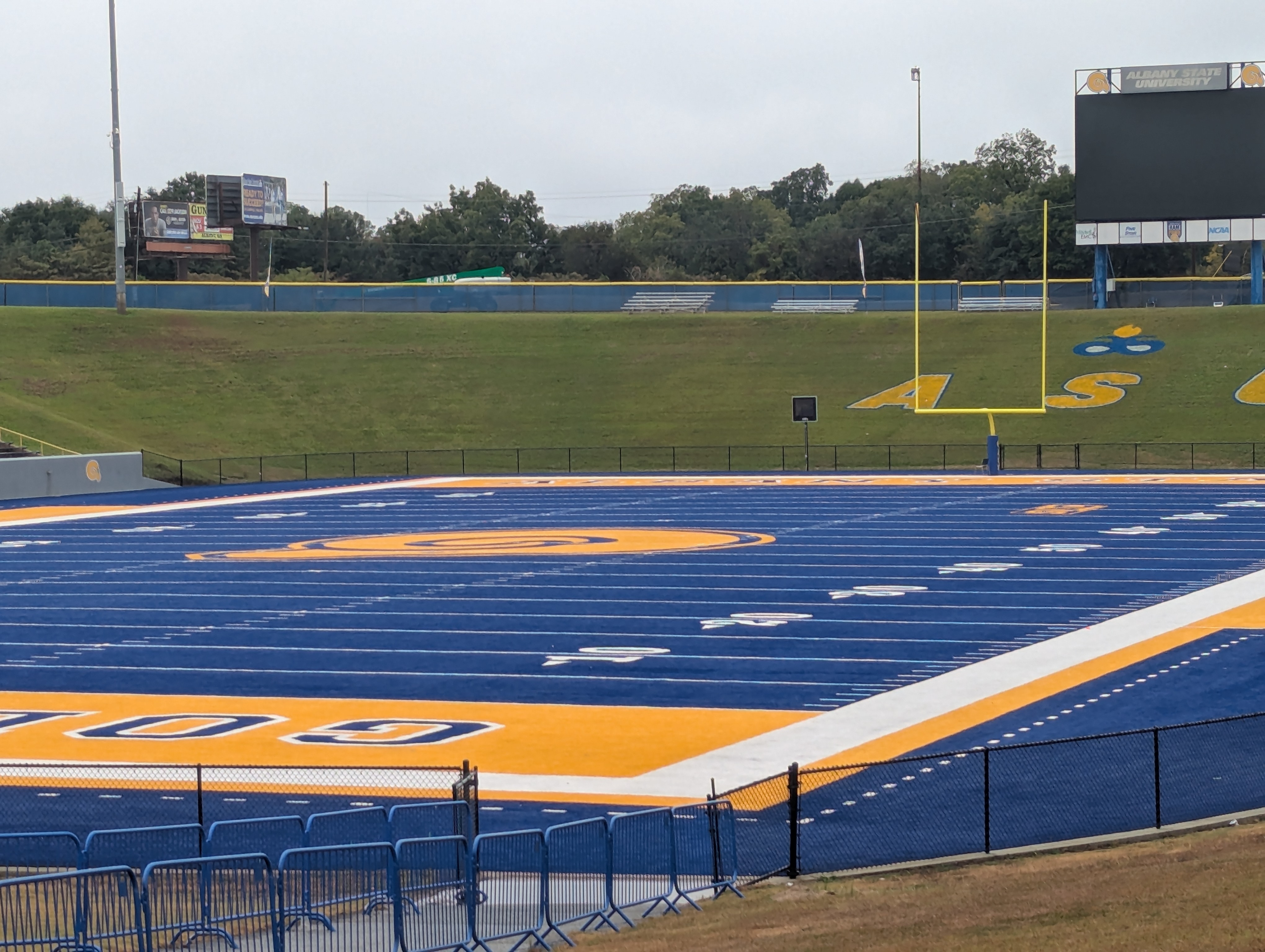
- Interactive map of Albany State University Coliseum
- Former names: Albany Municipal Coliseum
- Location: Albany, Georgia
- Coordinates: 31°34′23″N 84°8′13″W
- Owner: Albany State University
- Operator: Albany State University
- Capacity: 10,000
- Surface: Turf

Construction
- Opened: 2004
- Cost: $5 million
- Architect: Rosser International Inc.

Tenant
- Albany State University Golden Rams (NCAA) (2004-present)

Albany State University Coliseum is a stadium in Albany, Georgia. It is primarily used for American football, and is the home field of the Albany State University Golden Rams playing in the Southern Intercollegiate Athletic Conference (SIAC) in the NCAA Division II.

== Overview ==
The stadium holds 10,000 people and opened in 2004 on the campus. Albany State University has the second largest stadium in the SIAC; tied with Tuskegee with a 10,000 capacity (only behind Benedict College's Charlie W. Johnson Stadium, has a Capacity of 11,000).
