= 2003 NCAA Division II football season =

American college football season

- Regular season: September 6 – November 15, 2003
- Playoffs: November 22 – December 13, 2003
- National Championship: Braly Municipal Stadium; Florence, AL
- Champion: Grand Valley State (2)
- Harlon Hill Trophy: Will Hall, North Alabama

The 2003 NCAA Division II football season, part of college football in the United States organized by the National Collegiate Athletic Association at the Division II level, began on September 6, 2003, and concluded with the NCAA Division II Football Championship on December 13, 2003 at Braly Municipal Stadium in Florence, Alabama, hosted by the University of North Alabama. The Grand Valley State Lakers defeated the North Dakota Fighting Sioux, 10–3, to win their second Division II national title.

The Harlon Hill Trophy was awarded to Will Hall, quarterback from North Alabama.

== Conference changes and new programs ==
=== Conference changes ===
School	2002 Conference	2003 Conference
Minnesota Morris	Northern Sun	UMAC (D-III)
Morningside	North Central	GPAC (NAIA)
North Greenville	NAIA Independent	Independent
Northern Colorado	North Central	Independent
Quincy	Independent	Mid-States (NAIA)
Shaw	Program Revived	CIAA
Tiffin	Mid-States (NAIA)	Independent

== Conference standings ==
2003 Central Intercollegiate Athletic Association football standings
	Conf.			Overall
Team	W		L	W		L
Eastern
Virginia Union xy	5	–	2	6	–	5
Bowie State	5	–	2	6	–	4
Shaw	4	–	3	7	–	3
Virginia State	3	–	4	5	–	5
Elizabeth City State	2	–	5	2	–	8
Western
Fayetteville State # xy$	5	–	2	8	–	3
Winston-Salem State	5	–	2	7	–	3
Livingstone	3	–	4	3	–	7
North Carolina Central	2	–	5	4	–	6
Johnson C. Smith	1	–	6	1	–	9
St. Augustine's @	0	–	4	0	–	5
Championship: Fayetteville State 23, Virginia Union 19
$ – Conference champion; x – Division champion/co-champions; y – Championship game participant; # – Pioneer Bowl participant @ – St. Augustine's vacated 5 wins including 3 in conference play.

2003 Great Lakes Intercollegiate Athletic Conference football standings
	Conf.			Overall
Team	W		L	W		L
No. 1 Saginaw Valley State $^	10	–	0	12	–	1
No. 4 Grand Valley State ^	9	–	1	14	–	1
Northwood	6	–	4	6	–	5
Ferris State	5	–	5	6	–	5
Findlay	5	–	5	6	–	5
Indianapolis	5	–	5	6	–	5
Michigan Tech	5	–	5	5	–	5
Mercyhurst	4	–	6	5	–	6
Hillsdale	4	–	6	4	–	7
Northern Michigan	3	–	7	3	–	8
Wayne State (MI)	2	–	8	3	–	8
Ashland	2	–	8	2	–	9
$ – Conference champion; ^ – NCAA Division II playoff participant; Rankings from AFCA poll

2003 Great Northwest Athletic Conference football standings
	Conf.			Overall
Team	W		L	W		L
Western Washington $	3	–	0	4	–	6
Central Washington	2	–	1	6	–	4
Western Oregon	1	–	2	4	–	6
Humboldt State	0	–	3	3	–	7
$ – Conference champion; First Humboldt State vs. Western Oregon game (Sept. 6) did not count as a conference game

2003 Gulf South Conference football standings
	Conf.			Overall
Team	W		L	W		L
No. 2 North Alabama $^	9	–	0	13	–	1
No. 5 Valdosta State ^	8	–	1	10	–	2
No. 12 Southern Arkansas ^	7	–	2	9	–	3
No. 14 Delta State	7	–	2	9	–	2
Ouachita Baptist	4	–	5	5	–	5
Arkansas Tech	4	–	5	5	–	6
Central Arkansas	3	–	6	5	–	6
Harding	3	–	6	4	–	6
Arkansas–Monticello	3	–	6	4	–	7
Henderson State	3	–	6	4	–	7
West Georgia	2	–	7	3	–	8
West Alabama	1	–	8	2	–	9
$ – Conference champion; ^ – NCAA Division II playoff participant; Rankings from AFCA poll

2003 Lone Star Conference football standings
	Conf.			Overall
Team	W		L	W		L
Overall*
No. 3 Texas A&M–Kingsville $^	8	–	0	11	–	2
SE Oklahoma State	6	–	2	7	–	3
No. 20 Central Oklahoma ^	6	–	2	9	–	3
Midwestern State	6	–	2	7	–	3
No. 21 Tarleton State ^	6	–	2	8	–	4
Abilene Christian	5	–	3	6	–	4
Angelo State	3	–	5	3	–	8
East Central	3	–	5	3	–	8
Eastern New Mexico	3	–	5	6	–	5
Northeastern State	2	–	6	3	–	7
SW Oklahoma State	2	–	6	5	–	6
West Texas A&M	2	–	6	3	–	8
Texas A&M–Commerce	0	–	8	1	–	10
North
No. 21 Tarleton State x^	4	–	1	8	–	4
SE Oklahoma State	3	–	2	7	–	3
No. 20 Central Oklahoma ^	3	–	2	9	–	3
Northeastern State	2	–	3	3	–	7
East Central	2	–	3	3	–	8
SW Oklahoma State	1	–	4	5	–	6
South
No. 3 Texas A&M–Kingsville x$^	6	–	0	11	–	2
Abilene Christian	5	–	1	6	–	4
Midwestern State	4	–	2	7	–	3
Eastern New Mexico	2	–	4	6	–	5
West Texas A&M	2	–	4	3	–	8
Angelo State	2	–	4	3	–	8
Texas A&M–Commerce	0	–	6	1	–	10
$ – Conference champion; ^ – NCAA Division II playoff participant; * – The LSC counted separate overall and division standings.; Rankings from AFCA poll

2003 Mid-America Intercollegiate Athletics Association football standings
	Conf.			Overall
Team	W		L	W		L
No. 15 Central Missouri State +	7	–	2	9	–	2
No. 16 Emporia State +^	7	–	2	9	–	3
Missouri Western # +	7	–	2	9	–	3
No. 13 Pittsburg State +^	7	–	2	9	–	3
No. 25 NW Missouri State +	7	–	2	8	–	3
Truman	4	–	5	4	–	7
Washburn	3	–	6	5	–	6
Southwest Baptist	2	–	7	3	–	8
Missouri Southern	1	–	8	1	–	10
Missouri–Rolla	0	–	9	0	–	11
+ – Conference co-champions; ^ – NCAA Division II playoff participant; # – Mineral Water Bowl participant; Rankings from AFCA poll

2003 North Central Conference football standings
	Conf.			Overall
Team	W		L	W		L
No. 7 North Dakota $^	7	–	0	12	–	2
No. 23 North Dakota State	5	–	2	8	–	3
No. 24 Nebraska–Omaha	5	–	2	8	–	3
South Dakota State	4	–	3	7	–	4
St. Cloud State	4	–	3	7	–	4
South Dakota	2	–	5	5	–	6
Augustana (SD)	1	–	6	3	–	8
Minnesota State	0	–	7	0	–	11
$ – Conference champion; ^ – NCAA Division II playoff participant; Rankings from AFCA Poll

2003 Northeast-10 Conference football standings
	Conf.			Overall
Team	W		L	W		L
No. 19 Bentley $^	9	–	0	10	–	1
C. W. Post	8	–	1	9	–	2
Southern Connecticut	7	–	2	9	–	2
Merrimack	6	–	3	6	–	3
American International	5	–	4	5	–	4
Bryant	3	–	6	3	–	7
Assumption	2	–	7	4	–	7
Saint Anselm	2	–	7	3	–	7
Pace	2	–	7	2	–	8
Stonehill	1	–	8	1	–	10
$ – Conference champion; ^ – NCAA Division II playoff participant; Rankings from AFCA poll

2003 Northern Sun Intercollegiate Conference football standings
	Conf.			Overall
Team	W		L	W		L
No. 9 Winona State +^	7	–	1	11	–	2
Concordia–St. Paul +	7	–	1	8	–	4
Minnesota Duluth	6	–	2	8	–	3
Northern State	5	–	3	7	–	4
Bemidji State	5	–	3	7	–	4
Minnesota State–Moorhead	2	–	6	3	–	8
Wayne State (NE)	2	–	6	3	–	8
Southwest Minnesota State	1	–	7	3	–	8
Minnesota–Crookston	1	–	7	2	–	9
+ – Conference co-champions; ^ – NCAA Division II playoff participant; Rankings from AFCA Poll

2003 Pennsylvania State Athletic Conference football standings
	Conf.			Overall
Team	W		L	W		L
East Division
East Stroudsburg x	5	–	1	8	–	3
Bloomsburg x	5	–	1	7	–	4
West Chester	4	–	2	8	–	3
Mansfield	3	–	3	8	–	3
Kutztown	3	–	3	6	–	5
Millersville	1	–	5	4	–	7
Cheyney	0	–	6	2	–	9
West Division
No. 6 IUP x	5	–	1	10	–	1
No. 18 Edinboro x^	5	–	1	9	–	3
Shippensburg	4	–	2	8	–	3
California (PA)	2	–	4	6	–	4
Slippery Rock	2	–	4	4	–	7
Clarion	1	–	5	3	–	8
Lock Haven	1	–	5	3	–	8
x – Division champion/co-champions; ^ – NCAA Division II playoff participant; Rankings from AFCA poll

2003 Rocky Mountain Athletic Conference football standings
	Conf.			Overall
Team	W		L	W		L
Mesa State $^	8	–	0	10	–	2
Chadron State	6	–	2	8	–	2
Fort Hays State	5	–	3	6	–	5
Colorado Mines	4	–	4	6	–	5
Nebraska–Kearney	4	–	4	5	–	5
Western State (CO)	4	–	4	5	–	6
Adams State	3	–	5	4	–	7
Fort Lewis	2	–	6	3	–	8
New Mexico Highlands	0	–	8	0	–	11
$ – Conference champion; ^ – NCAA Division II playoff participant

2003 South Atlantic Conference football standings
	Conf.			Overall
Team	W		L	W		L
No. 8 Carson–Newman +^	6	–	1	11	–	2
No. 11 Catawba +	6	–	1	9	–	2
No. 17 Tusculum +	6	–	1	9	–	2
Mars Hill	3	–	4	7	–	4
Wingate	2	–	5	5	–	6
Presbyterian	2	–	5	4	–	6
Newberry	2	–	5	3	–	7
Lenoir–Rhyne	1	–	6	3	–	8
$ – Conference champion; ^ – NCAA Division II playoff participant; Rankings from AFCA poll

2003 Southern Intercollegiate Athletic Conference football standings
	Conf.			Overall
Team	W		L	W		L
Albany State # $	7	–	1	10	–	2
Miles	6	–	2	7	–	3
Kentucky State	6	–	2	7	–	4
Fort Valley State	5	–	3	7	–	4
Benedict	4	–	4	6	–	5
Tuskegee	4	–	4	5	–	6
Morehouse	3	–	5	4	–	7
Lane	1	–	7	2	–	9
Clark Atlanta	0	–	8	0	–	11
$ – Conference champion; # – Pioneer Bowl participant

2003 West Virginia Intercollegiate Athletic Conference football standings
	Conf.			Overall
Team	W		L	W		L
West Virginia Wesleyan $	7	–	0	9	–	2
Glenville State	4	–	3	5	–	6
Shepherd	4	–	3	4	–	6
Fairmont State	3	–	4	4	–	6
West Liberty State	3	–	4	4	–	7
West Virginia State	3	–	4	3	–	8
Concord	2	–	5	3	–	8
West Virginia Tech	2	–	5	3	–	8
$ – Conference champion

2003 NCAA Division II independents football records
	Conf.			Overall
Team	W		L	W		L
Gannon		–		9	–	1
UC Davis		–		6	–	4
Oklahoma Panhandle State		–		6	–	5
Quincy		–		5	–	6
Western New Mexico		–		3	–	7
Saint Joseph's (IN)		–		2	–	9
Kentucky Wesleyan		–		1	–	9
New Haven		–		1	–	9

== Conference summaries ==
Conference Champions

Central Intercollegiate Athletic Association – Fayetteville State
Great Lakes Intercollegiate Athletic Conference – Saginaw Valley State
Great Northwest Athletic Conference – Western Washington
Gulf South Conference – North Alabama
Lone Star Conference – Texas A&M–Kingsville
Mid-America Intercollegiate Athletics Association – Central Missouri State, Emporia State, Missouri Western State, Northwest Missouri State, and Pittsburg State
North Central Conference – North Dakota
Northeast-10 Conference – Bentley
Northern Sun Intercollegiate Conference – Concordia–Saint Paul and Winona State
Pennsylvania State Athletic Conference – Bloomsburg and East Stroudsburg (East), Edinboro and Indiana (PA) (West)
Rocky Mountain Athletic Conference – Mesa State
South Atlantic Conference – Carson-Newman, Catawba, and Tusculum
Southern Intercollegiate Athletic Conference – Albany State
West Virginia Intercollegiate Athletic Conference – West Virginia Wesleyan

== Postseason ==
2003 NCAA Division II Football Championship
- Teams: 16
- Finals Site: Braly Municipal Stadium; Florence, AL
- Champion: Grand Valley State; (2nd title, title game)
- Runner-up: North Dakota; (2nd title game)
- Semifinalists: North Alabama; Texas A&M–Kingsville
- Winning coach: championship

The 2003 NCAA Division II Football Championship playoffs were the 30th single-elimination tournament to determine the national champion of men's NCAA Division II. This was the final year of the 16-team bracket before the field expanded to 24 teams in 2004.

=== Playoff bracket ===
First round Campus sites
North Dakota	24
Pittsburg State	14
Winona State	10
Emporia State	3
North Alabama	48
Southern Arkansas	24
Carson–Newman	35
Valdosta State	29
Saginaw Valley State	33
Edinboro	9
Grand Valley State	65
Bentley	36
Central Oklahoma	20
Mesa State	15
Texas A&M–Kingsville	34
Tarleton State	10

Quarterfinals; Campus sites
North Dakota	36
Winona State	29
North Alabama	41
Carson–Newman	9
Saginaw Valley State	3
Grand Valley State	10
Central Oklahoma	6
Texas A&M–Kingsville	49

Semifinals; Campus sites
North Dakota	29
North Alabama	22
Grand Valley State	31
Texas A&M–Kingsville	3

Championship; Braly Municipal Stadium; Florence, AL
North Dakota	3
Grand Valley State	10

== See also ==
- 2003 NCAA Division I-A football season
- 2003 NCAA Division I-AA football season
- 2003 NCAA Division III football season
- 2003 NAIA football season
