= 2003 NCAA Division II football rankings =

The 2003 NCAA Division II football rankings are from the American Football Coaches Association (AFCA). This is for the 2003 season.

== Legend ==
	Increase in ranking
	Decrease in ranking
	Not ranked previous week
(#–#)	Win–loss record
(Italics)	Number of first place votes
т	Tied with team above or below also with this symbol

== American Football Coaches Association poll ==
	Preseason (Note: Although one was published, no preseason poll has been found. 23 of the 25 rankings are known, based on the first regular season poll.)	Week 1 Sept 3	Week 2 Sept 10	Week 3 Sept 17	Week 4 Sept 24	Week 5 Oct 1	Week 6 Oct 8	Week 7 Oct 15	Week 8 Oct 22	Week 9 Oct 29	Week 10 Nov 5	Week 11 Nov 12	Week 12 Nov 19	
1.	Grand Valley State	Grand Valley State (0–0) (25)	Grand Valley State (1–0) (24)	Grand Valley State (2–0) (24)	Grand Valley State (3–0) (23)	Grand Valley State (4–0) (23)	Grand Valley State (5–0) (22)	Grand Valley State (6–0) (25)	Valdosta State (7–0) (22)	Valdosta State (8–0) (26)	Saginaw Valley State (9–0) (17)	Saginaw Valley State (10–0) (23)	Saginaw Valley State (11–0) (24)	1.
2.	Valdosta State	Valdosta State (1–0) (1)	Valdosta State (2–0) (2)	Valdosta State (2–0) (2)	Valdosta State (3–0) (3)	Valdosta State (4–0) (3)	Valdosta State (5–0) (4)	Valdosta State (6–0) (1)	Saginaw Valley State (7–0) (4)	Saginaw Valley State (8–0)	North Alabama (9–0) (9)	North Alabama (10–0) (3)	North Alabama (11–0) (2)	2.
3.	Carson–Newman	Carson–Newman (1–0)	Carson–Newman (2–0)	Carson–Newman (3–0)	Carson–Newman (3–0)	Carson–Newman (4–0)	Carson–Newman (5–0)	Carson–Newman (6–0)	Carson–Newman (7–0)	North Alabama (8–0)	Texas A&M–Kingsville (7–1)	Texas A&M–Kingsville (8–1)	Texas A&M–Kingsville (9–1)	3.
4.	Northwest Missouri State	Northwest Missouri State (0–0)	IUP (1–0)	IUP (2–0)	IUP (3–0)	IUP (4–0)	IUP (5–0)	Pittsburg State (6–0)	North Alabama (7–0)	Texas A&M–Kingsville (6–1)	Grand Valley State (8–1)	Grand Valley State (9–1)	Grand Valley State (10–1)	4.
5.	Texas A&M–Kingsville	Texas A&M–Kingsville (0–0)	Saginaw Valley State (1–0)	Pittsburg State (2–0)	Pittsburg State (3–0)	Pittsburg State (4–0)	Pittsburg State (5–0)	Saginaw Valley State (6–0)	Texas A&M–Kingsville (5–1)	Central Oklahoma (7–1)	Valdosta State (8–1)	Valdosta State (9–1)	Valdosta State (10–1)	5.
6.	IUP (Note: In the actual printed polls, IUP was listed as Indiana (PA))	IUP (0–0)	St. Cloud State (2–0)	Saginaw Valley State (2–0)	Saginaw Valley State (3–0)	Saginaw Valley State (4–0)	Saginaw Valley State (5–0)	Texas A&M–Kingsville (4–1)	Central Oklahoma (7–0)	Grand Valley State (7–1)	Catawba (8–1)	IUP (9–1)	IUP (10–1)	6.
7.	Saginaw Valley State	Saginaw Valley State (0–0)	Pittsburg State (1–0)	Central Missouri State (2–0)	Central Missouri State (3–0)	Central Missouri State (4–0)	Central Missouri State (5–0)	North Alabama (6–0)	Grand Valley State (6–1)	Catawba (7–1)	IUP (8–1)	North Dakota (9–1)	North Dakota (9–1)	7.
8.	St. Cloud State	St. Cloud State (1–0)	Central Missouri State (1–0)	Catawba (2–0)	Catawba (3–0)	Texas A&M–Kingsville (2–1)	Nebraska–Omaha (5–1)	North Dakota State (5–1)	Catawba (6–1)	IUP (7–1)	North Dakota (8–1)	Carson–Newman (9–1)	Carson–Newman (10–1)	8.
9.	Central Washington	Pittsburg State (0–0)	Minnesota–Duluth (1–0)	Chadron State (2–0)	Southern Arkansas (3–0)	Winona State (5–0)	Texas A&M–Kingsville (3–1)	Central Oklahoma (6–0)	IUP (6–1)	North Dakota (7–1)	Pittsburg State (8–1)	Pittsburg State (9–1)	Winona State (10–1)	9.
10.	Tuskegee	Tuskegee (0–1)	Catawba (1–0)	Southern Arkansas (2–0)	Texas A&M–Kingsville (1–1)	Nebraska–Omaha (4–1)	Emporia State (5–0)	Catawba (5–1)	North Dakota (6–1)	Pittsburg State (7–1)	Carson–Newman (8–1)	Emporia State (9–1)	Mesa State (10–1)	10.
11.	Pittsburg State	Minnesota–Duluth (0–0)	Bloomsburg (1–0)	Texas A&M–Kingsville (0–1)	Winona State (4–0)	St. Cloud State (4–1)	North Alabama (5–0)	IUP (5–1)	Pittsburg State (6–1)	Carson–Newman (7–1)	Emporia State (8–1)	Winona State (9–1)	Catawba (9–2)	11.
12.	Minnesota–Duluth	Central Missouri State (1–0)	Chadron State (0–0)	Central Arkansas (2–0)	St. Cloud State (3–1)	Emporia State (4–0)	North Dakota State (4–1)	North Dakota (5–1)	Emporia State (6–1)	Emporia State (7–1)	Central Missouri State (8–1)	Central Oklahoma (8–1)	Southern Arkansas (9–2)	12.
13.	Tarleton State	Catawba (0–0)	Texas A&M–Kingsville (0–1)	Tuskegee (2–1)	Nebraska–Omaha (3–1)	North Alabama (4–0)	Central Oklahoma (5–0)	Delta State (5–1)	Winona State (7–1)	Central Missouri State (7–1)	Winona State (8–1)	Catawba (8–2)	Pittsburg State (9–2)	13.
14.	Catawba	Tarleton State (0–0)	Tuskegee (1–1)	Fayetteville State (2–0)	Shippensburg (3–0)	North Dakota State (3–1)	Chadron State (4–1)	Winona State (6–1)	Central Missouri State (6–1)	Winona State (7–1)	Central Oklahoma (7–1)	Mesa State (9–1)	Delta State (9–2)	14.
15.	Chadron State	Bloomsburg (1–0)	Central Arkansas (1–0)	Winona State (3–0)	Minnesota–Duluth (2–1)	Southern Arkansas (3–1)	Catawba (4–1)	Central Missouri State (5–1)	Mesa State (6–1)	Tusculum (7–1)	Mesa State (8–1)	Southern Arkansas (8–2)	Central Missouri State (9–2)	15.
16.	Central Missouri State	Chadron State (0–0)	Southern Arkansas (1–0)	St. Cloud State (2–1)	East Stroudsburg (3–0)	Chadron State (3–1)	North Dakota (4–1)	Mesa State (5–1)	North Dakota State (6–2)	Mesa State (7–1)	North Dakota State (7–2)	Delta State (8–2)	Emporia State (9–2)	16.
17.	Fayetteville State	Fayetteville State (0–0)	Fayetteville State (1–0)	Northwest Missouri State (1–1)	Emporia State (3–0)	Catawba (3–1)	Delta State (4–1)	Bentley (6–0)	Nebraska–Omaha (6–2)	North Dakota State (6–2)	Southern Arkansas (7–2)	Central Missouri State (8–2)	Tusculum (9–2)	17.
18.	Bloomsburg	Nebraska–Omaha (1–0)	Northwest Missouri State (0–1)	Findlay (2–0)	North Dakota State (2–1)	Central Oklahoma (4–0)	Winona State (5–1)	Emporia State (5–1)	St. Cloud State (6–2)	Nebraska–Omaha (7–2)	Tarleton State (7–2)	Tusculum (8–2)	Edinboro (9–2)	18.
19.	Central Arkansas	Central Arkansas (0–0)	North Dakota (1–0)	Nebraska–Omaha (2–1)	Tarleton State (2–1)	Eastern New Mexico (4–0)	Shippensburg (4–1)	Nebraska–Omaha (5–2)	Bentley (7–0)	Southern Arkansas (6–2)	Bentley (8–0)	Bentley (9–0)	Bentley (10–0)	19.
20.		Southern Arkansas (0–0)	North Dakota State (2–0)	Shippensburg (2–0)	Fayetteville State (2–1)	North Dakota (3–1)	Bentley (5–0)	St. Cloud State (5–2)	Tusculum (6–1)	Bentley (8–0)	Delta State (7–2)	Edinboro (8–2)	Central Oklahoma (8–2)	20.
21.		Shepherd (0–0)	Central Washington (1–1)	Minnesota–Duluth (1–1)	Chadron State (2–1)	Delta State (3–1)	St. Cloud State (4–2)	Eastern New Mexico (5–1)	Southern Arkansas (5–2)	Tarleton State (6–2)	Tusculum (7–2)	Chadron State (7–2)	Tarleton State (8–3)	21.
22.	Nebraska–Omaha	Central Washington (0–1)	Winona State (2–0)	North Dakota State (2–1)	North Alabama (3–0)	Shippensburg (3–1)	Mesa State (4–1)	Tusculum (5–1)	Tarleton State (5–2)	Delta State (6–2)	Edinboro (7–2)	Nebraska–Omaha (8–3)	Chadron State (8–2)	22.
23.	Shepherd	Abilene Christian (0–0)	Findlay (1–0)	South Dakota (2–0)	Central Arkansas (2–1)	Bentley (4–0)	Eastern New Mexico (4–1)	Mansfield (6–0)	Northwest Missouri State (5–2)	Edinboro (6–2)	Chadron State (7–2)	North Dakota State (7–3)	North Dakota State (8–3)	23.
24.	Southern Arkansas	North Dakota (0–0)	Nebraska–Omaha (1–1)	Tarleton State (1–1) т	Central Oklahoma (3–0)	West Chester (3–1)	Tusculum (4–1)	Tarleton State (4–2)	Delta State (5–2)	Chadron State (6–2)	Southeastern Oklahoma State (7–2)	Tarleton State (7–3)	Nebraska–Omaha (8–3)	24.
25.	Abilene Christian	Findlay (1–0)	Tarleton State (0–1)	East Stroudsburg (2–0) т	North Dakota (2–1)	East Stroudsburg (3–1)	Findlay (4–1)	Northwest Missouri State (4–2)	Concordia (MN) (6–1)	Missouri Western State (6–2)	Nebraska–Omaha (7–3)	Minnesota–Duluth (8–2)	Northwest Missouri State (8–3)	25.
26.				Emporia State (2–0) т										26.
	Preseason (Note: Although one was published, no preseason poll has been found. 23 of the 25 rankings are known, based on the first regular season poll.)	Week 1 Sept 3	Week 2 Sept 10	Week 3 Sept 17	Week 4 Sept 24	Week 5 Oct 1	Week 6 Oct 8	Week 7 Oct 15	Week 8 Oct 22	Week 9 Oct 29	Week 10 Nov 5	Week 11 Nov 12	Week 12 Nov 19	
		Dropped: 20; 21	Dropped: 21 Shepherd; 23 Abilene Christian	Dropped: 11 Bloomsburg; 19 North Dakota; 21 Central Washington	Dropped: 13 Tuskegee; 17 Northwest Missouri State; 18 Findlay; 23 South Dakota	Dropped: 15 Minnesota–Duluth; 19 Tarleton State; 20 Fayetteville State; 23 Central Arkansas	Dropped: 15 Southern Arkansas; 24 West Chester; 25 East Stroudsburg	Dropped: 14 Chadron State; 19 Shippensburg; 25 Findlay	Dropped: 21 Eastern New Mexico; 23 Mansfield	Dropped: 18 St. Cloud State; 23 Northwest Missouri State; 25 Concordia (MN)	Dropped: 25 Missouri Western State	Dropped: 24 Southeastern Oklahoma State	Dropped: 25 Minnesota–Duluth	
