= 2007 Chadron State Eagles football team =

American college football season

2007 Chadron State Eagles football

RMAC champion

NCAA Division II Quarterfinal, L 13–26 vs. Northwest Missouri State
- Conference: Rocky Mountain Athletic Conference
- Record: 12–1 (8–0 RMAC)
- Head coach: Bill O'Boyle (4th season)
- Defensive coordinator: Todd Auer (14th season)
- Home stadium: Elliott Field at Don Beebe Stadium

2007 Rocky Mountain Athletic Conference football standings
	Conf.			Overall
Team	W		L	W		L
No. 5 Chadron State $^	8	–	0	12	–	1
No. 19 Mesa State ^	7	–	1	10	–	2
Colorado Mines #	6	–	2	7	–	5
Nebraska–Kearney	5	–	3	6	–	4
Western New Mexico	4	–	4	4	–	6
New Mexico Highlands–	3	–	5	4	–	6
Adams State	2	–	6	2	–	9
Fort Lewis	1	–	7	1	–	9
Western State (CO)	0	–	8	1	–	10
$ – Conference champion; ^ – NCAA Division II playoff participant; # – Dixie Rotary Bowl participant; Rankings from AFCA poll

The 2007 Chadron State Eagles football team represented Chadron State College as a member of the Rocky Mountain Athletic Conference (RMAC) during the 2007 NCAA Division II football season. Led by head coach Bill O'Boyle and record-setting running back and Harlon Hill Trophy winner Danny Woodhead, the Eagles compiled an overall record of 12–1 with a mark of 8–0 in conference play, winning the RMAC title. After an 11–0 regular season, Chadron State advanced to the NCAA Division II Football Championship playoffs and received a first-round bye. The Eagles beat Abilene Christian in the second round in triple overtime by a score of 76–73. It was the highest scoring game in NCAA football history. Chadron State lost to Northwest Missouri State in the quarterfinals.

== Schedule ==
Date	Opponent	Rank	Site	Result	Attendance
August 25	at No. 25 Washburn	No. 5	Yager Stadium at Moore Bowl; Topeka, KS	W 34–24	7,489
September 1	Wayne State (NE)	No. 5	Elliott Field at Don Beebe Stadium; Chadron, NE	W 55–14	3,000
September 8	at Northern Colorado	No. 6	Nottingham Field; Greeley, CO	W 31–0	6,684
September 22	at Colorado Mines	No. 5	Brooks Field; Golden, CO	W 35–7	1,356
September 29	New Mexico Highlands	No. 4	Elliott Field at Don Beebe Stadium; Chadron, NE	W 49–0	4,100
October 6	at Western New Mexico	No. 4	Mustang Stadium; Silver City, NM	W 21–0	1,200
October 13	Fort Lewis	No. 4	Elliott Field at Don Beebe Stadium; Chadron, NE	W 31–9	3,000
October 18	at Nebraska–Kearney	No. 3	Ron & Carol Cope Stadium; Kearney, NE	W 28–16	8,256
October 27	No. 18 Mesa State	No. 3	Elliott Field at Don Beebe Stadium; Chadron, NE	W 7–6	3,800
November 3	at Western State (CO)	No. 2	Mountaineer Bowl; Gunnison, CO	W 50–17	672
November 10	Adams State	No. 2	Elliott Field at Don Beebe Stadium; Chadron, NE	W 58–0	3,200
November 24	No. 15 Abilene Christian	No. 2	Elliott Field at Don Beebe Stadium; Chadron, NE (NCAA Division II Second Round)	W 76–73 ^{3OT}	5,000
December 1	No. 5 Northwest Missouri State	No. 2	Elliott Field at Don Beebe Stadium; Chadron, NE (NCAA Division II Quarterfinal)	L 13–26	3,800
Rankings from AFCA Poll released prior to the game
