= Guy Gardner =

Guy Gardner may refer to:

- Guy Gardner (astronaut) (born 1948), United States Air Force officer and former astronaut
- Guy Gardner (character) (created 1968), DC Comics character who primarily operates as a Green Lantern
- Guy B. Gardner (1920–1980), head football coach for the Howard Payne University Yellow Jackets
