= Bill O'Boyle =

American football player and coach (born 1963)

Current position
- Title: Offensive line coach
- Team: San Diego State
- Conference: MW

Biographical details
- Born: October 19, 1963 (age 63); Des Moines, Iowa, U.S.

Playing career
- 1982–1983: Western Illinois

Coaching career (HC unless noted)
- 1987–1989: Chadron State (OL)
- 1990–1993: Western Illinois (OL)
- 1994–1998: Chadron State (assistant)
- 1999–2004: Chadron State (OC)
- 2005–2011: Chadron State
- 2012: Colorado Mesa (OC)
- 2013: Southern Illinois (OL)
- 2014–2015: Southern Illinois (co-OC/OL)
- 2016–2017: South Dakota (OL)
- 2018–2022: Kent State (OL)
- 2023: Colorado (OL)
- 2024–2025: Northwestern (OL)
- 2026–present: San Diego State (OL)

Head coaching record
- Overall: 57–21
- Tournaments: 3–3 (NCAA D-II playoffs)

Accomplishments and honors

Championships
- 3 RMAC (2006–2008)

Awards
- Liberty Mutual Coach of the Year (2007)

Bill O'Boyle (born October 19, 1963) is an American football coach and former player. He is the current offensive line coach at San Diego State University. O'Boyle served as the head football coach at Chadron State College from 2005 to 2011. In 2007, he was awarded the Liberty Mutual Coach of the Year Award for NCAA Division II.

== Coaching career ==
O'Boyle took over the head coaching job at Chadron State College in 2005. During his tenure with the Eagles, he won three Rocky Mountain Athletic Conference championships, advanced to the NCAA Division II Football Championship three times and coached former Harlon Hill Trophy winner Danny Woodhead. During his seven season tenure, he compiled an overall record of 57 wins and 21 losses (57–21). In March 2012, O'Boyle was hired to serve as offensive coordinator at Colorado Mesa.

== Head coaching record ==
Year	Team	Overall	Conference	Standing	Bowl/playoffs
Chadron State Eagles (Rocky Mountain Athletic Conference) (2005–2011)
2005	Chadron State	4–6	4–4	T–5th	
2006	Chadron State	12–1	8–0	1st	L NCAA Division II Quarterfinal
2007	Chadron State	12–1	8–0	1st	L NCAA Division II Quarterfinal
2008	Chadron State	11–2	9–0	1st	L NCAA Division II Second Round
2009	Chadron State	7–4	6–3	T–3rd	
2010	Chadron State	8–3	7–2	T–2nd	
2011	Chadron State	3–4	2–3		
Chadron State:		57–21	44–12		
Total:		57–21			
National championship Conference title Conference division title or championship game berth
