= 2007 Abilene Christian Wildcats football team =

American college football season

2007 Abilene Christian Wildcats football

NCAA Division II Second Round, L 73–76 ^{3OT} vs. Chadron State
- Conference: Lone Star Conference
- South Division

Ranking
- AFCA: No. 15
- Record: 0–3, 10 wins vacated (0–1 LSC, 8 wins vacated)
- Head coach: Chris Thomsen (3rd season)
- Offensive coordinator: Ken Collums (3rd season)
- Offensive scheme: Spread
- Defensive coordinator: Jason Johns (2nd season)
- Base defense: 3–4
- Home stadium: Shotwell Stadium

2007 Lone Star Conference football standings
| | Conf. | | | Overall |
| Team | W | | L | W | | L |
|---|---|---|---|---|---|---|
Overall*
| No. 8 W. Texas A&M $^ | 9 | – | 0 | 12 | – | 1 |
| No. 15 Abilene Christian ^† | 8 | – | 1 | 10 | – | 3 |
| No. 21 Tarleton State | 7 | – | 2 | 9 | – | 2 |
| No. 25 Midwestern State | 6 | – | 3 | 8 | – | 3 |
| Texas A&M–Commerce | 5 | – | 4 | 5 | – | 6 |
| SW Oklahoma State | 4 | – | 5 | 6 | – | 5 |
| Central Oklahoma | 4 | – | 5 | 4 | – | 6 |
| Eastern New Mexico | 3 | – | 6 | 5 | – | 6 |
| SE Oklahoma State | 3 | – | 6 | 4 | – | 6 |
| Northeastern State | 3 | – | 6 | 3 | – | 7 |
| Texas A&M–Kingsville | 3 | – | 6 | 3 | – | 8 |
| Angelo State | 2 | – | 7 | 2 | – | 8 |
| East Central | 2 | – | 7 | 2 | – | 9 |
North
| SW Oklahoma State x | 3 | – | 2 | 6 | – | 5 |
| Texas A&M–Commerce x | 3 | – | 2 | 5 | – | 6 |
| SE Oklahoma State x | 3 | – | 2 | 4 | – | 6 |
| Central Oklahoma x | 3 | – | 2 | 4 | – | 6 |
| Northeastern State x | 3 | – | 2 | 3 | – | 7 |
| East Central | 0 | – | 5 | 2 | – | 9 |
South
| No. 8 W. Texas A&M $^ | 6 | – | 0 | 12 | – | 1 |
| No. 15 Abilene Christian ^† | 5 | – | 1 | 10 | – | 3 |
| No. 21 Tarleton State | 4 | – | 2 | 9 | – | 2 |
| No. 25 Midwestern State | 3 | – | 3 | 8 | – | 3 |
| Texas A&M–Kingsville | 2 | – | 4 | 3 | – | 8 |
| Angelo State | 1 | – | 5 | 2 | – | 8 |
| Eastern New Mexico | 0 | – | 6 | 5 | – | 6 |
$ – Conference champion; ^ – NCAA Division II playoff participant; * – The LSC counted separate overall and division standings. † – Abilene Christian vacated all ten wins.; Rankings from AFCA Poll

The 2006 Abilene Christian Wildcats football team was an American football team that represented Abilene Christian University (ACU) as a member of the South Division of the Lone Star Conference (LSC) during the 2007 NCAA Division II football season. In their third season under head coach Chris Thomsen, the Wildcats compiled an overall record of 10–3, with an 8–1 mark in conference play, placing second in the LSC's South Division. Abilene Christian advanced to the NCAA Division II Football Championship playoffs, where the Wildcats defeated [Mesa State in the first round before losing to Chadron State in triple overtime, 76–73, in the second round. The team played home games at Shotwell Stadium in Abilene, Texas.

All ten wins, including the eight conference victories, were later vacated due to NCAA violations.

== Schedule ==
| Date | Time | Opponent | Rank | Site | Result | Attendance | Source |
|---|---|---|---|---|---|---|---|
| September 1 | 6:00 p.m. | at Central Oklahoma* | No. 11 | Wantland Stadium; Edmond, OK | L 17–27 | 3,850 | |
| September 8 | 6:00 p.m. | at Texas State* | No. 24 | Bobcat Stadium; San Marcos, TX | W 45–27 (vacated) | 12,726 | |
| September 15 | 6:00 p.m. | Southeastern Oklahoma State | No. 21 | Shotwell Stadium; Abilene, TX | W 41–3 (vacated) | 8,144 | |
| September 22 | 6:00 p.m. | at Southwestern Oklahoma State | No. 18 | Milam Stadium; Weatherford, OK | W 50–14 (vacated) | 3,500 | |
| September 29 | 7:00 p.m. | Eastern New Mexico | No. 17 | Shotwell Stadium; Abilene, TX | W 45–20 (vacated) | 7,000 | |
| October 6 | 6:00 p.m. | Northeastern State | No. 15 | Shotwell Stadium; Abilene, TX | W 58–7 (vacated) | 7,000 | |
| October 13 | 6:00 p.m. | at Angelo State | No. 14 | San Angelo Stadium; San Angelo, TX | W 52–28 (vacated) | 5,850 | |
| October 20 | 2:00 p.m. | No. 6 West Texas A&M | No. 12 | Shotwell Stadium; Abilene, TX | L 31–41 | 12,172 | |
| October 27 | 2:00 p.m. | at No. 8 Tarleton State | No. 21 | Memorial Stadium; Stephenville, TX | W 70–63 (vacated) | 6,412 | |
| November 3 | 2:00 p.m. | Texas A&M–Kingsville | No. 19 | Shotwell Stadium; Abilene, TX | W 59–31 (vacated) | 6,385 | |
| November 10 | 1:00 p.m. | at No. 19 Midwestern State | No. 17 | Memorial Stadium; Wichita Falls, TX | W 42–41 (vacated) | 6,130 | |
| November 17 | 12:00 p.m. | No. 17 Mesa State* | No. 15 | Shotwell Stadium; Abilene, TX (NCAA Division II First Round) | W 56–12 (vacated) | 7,346 | |
| November 24 | 12:00 p.m. | at No. 2 Chadron State* | No. 15 | Elliott Field at Don Beebe Stadium; Chadron, NE (NCAA Division II Second Round) | L 73–76 ^{3OT} | 5,000 | |
*Non-conference game; Rankings from AFCA Poll released prior to the game; All times are in Central time
