= Scott Conley (American football) =

American football player and coach (born 1947)

Current position
- Title: Director of football operations
- Team: Utah State
- Conference: MW

Biographical details
- Born: December 24, 1947 (age 78); Winnsboro, Texas, U.S.
- Education: East Texas State University

Playing career
- 1966: Texas A&M

Coaching career (HC unless noted)
- 1971: Whitewright HS (TX) (assistant)
- 1972–1973: Mt. Vernon HS (TX) (assistant)
- 1974–1976: Plano HS (TX) (LB)
- 1977–1979: Plano HS (TX) (OC)
- 1980–1981: Texas A&M (RB)
- 1982–1986: Texas (RB)
- 1987: Kansas (LB)
- 1988: Tennessee (RB)
- 1989: Rice (RB/WR)
- 1990–1992: Arkansas (LB/TE/ST)
- 1993–1995: Howard Payne (ST/DB)
- 1996–1999: Trinity Valley
- 2000–2001: Navy (ST)
- 2004–2008: Texas A&M–Commerce
- 2009–2017: North Texas (asst AD / DFO)
- 2018–2020: Arkansas State (asst AD / DFO)
- 2021–present: Utah State (DFO)

Head coaching record
- Overall: 24–26 (college); 32–12 (junior college)
- Bowls: 2–0 (junior college)
- Tournaments: 4–2 (SWJCFC playoffs)

Accomplishments and honors

Championships
- 1 NJCAA National (1997); 2 SWJCFC (1997, 1999)

Awards
- NJCAA National Coach of the Year (1997)

Scott Conley (born December 24, 1947) is an American football coach. He is the director for football operations at Arkansas State University, a position he has held since 2021. Conley served as the head football coach at Trinity Valley Community College in Athens, Texas from 1996 to 1999 and Texas A&M University–Commerce from 2004 to 2008. At Trinity Valley he won a NJCAA National Football Championship and was named NJCAA National Coach of the Year in 1997. From 2009 to 2017, Conley was assistant athletic director for football operations and on-campus recruiting coordinator at University of North Texas, working under three head coaches, Todd Dodge, Dan McCarney, and Seth Littrell.

== Early life ==
Conley was a standout athlete at Winnsboro High School and accepted a scholarship from the Texas A&M University in College Station, Texas, where he played on the freshmen varsity in 1966 before transferring to East Texas State (now Texas A&M University–Commerce). He graduated from East Texas State with a bachelor's degree in business administration in 1970 and later a master's degree in higher education. He then became assistant coach at the high school level. In 1977, he served as offensive coordinator on the Plano Senior High School squad that won a 4A state championship.

== Early college coaching career ==
Conley moved up to the collegiate ranks, becoming running backs coach under Tom Wilson at Texas A&M in 1980, coaching three future NFL draft picks over two seasons. After Wilson was fired in 1982, Conley moved on to coach the running backs at the University of Texas at Austin under coach Fred Akers. During his five-year tenure with the Longhorns, the team won the Southwest Conference championship in 1983, and Conley's linebackers featured two All-Americans and five NFL Draft picks. After successive one-year stints the University of Kansas in 1987, the University of Tennessee in 1988, and Rice University in 1989, Conley spent three seasons, from 1990 to 1992 as an assistant the University of Arkansas.

Following three seasons as an assistant at Howard Payne University, Conley got his first head coaching position at Trinity Valley Community College in Athens, Texas in 1996. In 1997, he guided the Cardinals to a perfect 12–0 season, including a Red River Bowl victory over Garden City Community College. He was named the NJCAA National Coach of the Year and American Football Quarterly Junior College Coach of the Year. Conley left Trinity Valley in 2000 for the United States Naval Academy, where he coached the special teams for two years before moving into private business.

== Texas A&M–Commerce ==
In December 2003, Conley was introduced at his alma mater, Texas A&M University–Commerce, as the school's 17th head football coach after former coach, Eddie Brister announced his retirement. Conley had a tall order as the Lions were coming off their one of their worst seasons in school history and a stagnant offense. Conley brought Valdosta State transfer quarterback Buster Faulkner to Commerce and he led the Lone Star Conference in passing. Conley fielded competitive teams during his tenure in Commerce, but in his five years worked for four athletic directors and had three teams that went 5–5, with the only championship of any kind coming in 2007 as the Lions won the North Division of the Lone Star Conference. After finishing 5–5 again in 2008, Conley was relieved of his duties and replaced by former Baylor University coach Guy Morriss.

== North Texas ==
Conley was named the director of football operations at the University of North Texas in the spring of 2009.

== Head coaching record ==
=== Junior college ===
Year	Team	Overall	Conference	Standing	Bowl/playoffs
Trinity Valley Cardinals (Southwest Junior College Football Conference) (1996–1999)
1996	Trinity Valley	4–6	3–3	T–3rd	L SWJCFC semifinal
1997	Trinity Valley	12–0	7–0	1st	W SWJCFC championship, W Red River Bowl
1998	Trinity Valley	7–3	6–1	T–1st	L SWJCFC semifinal
1999	Trinity Valley	9–3	5–2	T–2nd	W Red River Bowl—SWJCFC championship
Trinity Valley:		32–12	21–6		
Total:		32–12			
National championship Conference title Conference division title or championship game berth

=== College ===
Year	Team	Overall	Conference	Standing	Bowl/playoffs
Texas A&M–Commerce Lions (Lone Star Conference) (2004–2008)
2004	Texas A&M–Commerce	4–6	4–5	9th	
2005	Texas A&M–Commerce	5–5	3–2	T–3rd	
2006	Texas A&M–Commerce	5–5	3–3	2nd (North)	
2007	Texas A&M–Commerce	5–6	5–3	T–1st (North)	
2008	Texas A&M–Commerce	5–5	4–5	3rd (North)	
Texas A&M–Commerce:		24–26			
Total:		24–26			
National championship Conference title Conference division title or championship game berth
