= 2007 Texas A&M–Commerce Lions football team =

American college football season

2007 Texas A&M–Commerce Lions football

LSC North Division champion
- Conference: Lone Star Conference
- North Division
- Record: 5–6 (5–4 LSC)
- Head coach: Scott Conley (4th season)
- Home stadium: Memorial Stadium

2007 Lone Star Conference football standings
| | Conf. | | | Overall |
| Team | W | | L | W | | L |
|---|---|---|---|---|---|---|
Overall*
| No. 8 W. Texas A&M $^ | 9 | – | 0 | 12 | – | 1 |
| No. 15 Abilene Christian ^† | 8 | – | 1 | 10 | – | 3 |
| No. 21 Tarleton State | 7 | – | 2 | 9 | – | 2 |
| No. 25 Midwestern State | 6 | – | 3 | 8 | – | 3 |
| Texas A&M–Commerce | 5 | – | 4 | 5 | – | 6 |
| SW Oklahoma State | 4 | – | 5 | 6 | – | 5 |
| Central Oklahoma | 4 | – | 5 | 4 | – | 6 |
| Eastern New Mexico | 3 | – | 6 | 5 | – | 6 |
| SE Oklahoma State | 3 | – | 6 | 4 | – | 6 |
| Northeastern State | 3 | – | 6 | 3 | – | 7 |
| Texas A&M–Kingsville | 3 | – | 6 | 3 | – | 8 |
| Angelo State | 2 | – | 7 | 2 | – | 8 |
| East Central | 2 | – | 7 | 2 | – | 9 |
North Division
| SW Oklahoma State x | 3 | – | 2 | 6 | – | 5 |
| Texas A&M–Commerce x | 3 | – | 2 | 5 | – | 6 |
| SE Oklahoma State x | 3 | – | 2 | 4 | – | 6 |
| Central Oklahoma x | 3 | – | 2 | 4 | – | 6 |
| Northeastern State x | 3 | – | 2 | 3 | – | 7 |
| East Central | 0 | – | 5 | 2 | – | 9 |
South Division
| No. 8 W. Texas A&M $^ | 6 | – | 0 | 12 | – | 1 |
| No. 15 Abilene Christian ^† | 5 | – | 1 | 10 | – | 3 |
| No. 21 Tarleton State | 4 | – | 2 | 9 | – | 2 |
| No. 25 Midwestern State | 3 | – | 3 | 8 | – | 3 |
| Texas A&M–Kingsville | 2 | – | 4 | 3 | – | 8 |
| Angelo State | 1 | – | 5 | 2 | – | 8 |
| Eastern New Mexico | 0 | – | 6 | 5 | – | 6 |
$ – Conference champion; ^ – NCAA Division II playoff participant; * – The LSC counted separate overall and division standings. † – Abilene Christian vacated all ten wins.; Rankings from AFCA Poll

The 2007 Texas A&M–Commerce Lions football team represented Texas A&M University–Commerce—as a member of the North Division of the Lone Star Conference (LSC) during the 2007 NCAA Division II football season. Led by fourth-year head coach Scott Conley, the Lions compiled an overall record of 5–6 with a mark of 5–4 in conference play, winning the LSC North Division title. The team played its home games at Memorial Stadium in Commerce, Texas.

== Schedule ==
| Date | Time | Opponent | Site | Result | Attendance |
|---|---|---|---|---|---|
| August 25 | 1:35 p.m. | at No. 7 Pittsburg State* | Carnie Smith Stadium; Pittsburg, KS | L 14–28 | 9,264 |
| September 1 | 7:00 p.m. | Ouachita Baptist* | Memorial Stadium; Commerce, TX | L 27–29 | 1,633 |
| September 8 | 7:00 p.m. | Texas A&M–Kingsville | Memorial Stadium; Commerce, TX (Chennault Cup) | W 24–7 | 1,547 |
| September 15 | 6:00 p.m. | at No. 14 West Texas A&M | Kimbrough Memorial Stadium; Canyon, TX (East Texas vs. West Texas) | L 14–45 | 12,482 |
| September 22 | 7:00 p.m. | at No. 16 Tarleton State | Memorial Stadium; Stephenville, TX (President's Cup) | L 7–24 | 3,112 |
| September 29 | 7:00 p.m. | Central Oklahoma | Memorial Stadium; Commerce, TX | L 20–21 ^{2OT} | 1,516 |
| October 6 | 2:00 p.m. | at Southeastern Oklahoma State | Paul Laird Field; Durant, OK | W 41–39 ^{3OT} | 1,237 |
| October 13 | 2:00 p.m. | Northeastern State | Memorial Stadium; Commerce, TX | W 30–3 | 1,190 |
| October 20 | 2:00 p.m. | Angelo State | Memorial Stadium; Commerce, TX | W 20–17 | 2,444 |
| October 27 | 2:00 p.m. | at East Central | Norris Field; Ada, OK | W 43–21 | 2,800 |
| November 10 | 2:00 p.m. | at Southwestern Oklahoma State | Milam Stadium; Weatherford, OK | L 14–21 | 1,500 |
*Non-conference game; Rankings from AFCA Poll released prior to the game; All times are in Central time

== Postseason awards ==
=== LSC Superlatives ===
- Defensive Lineman of the Year: Marcus Smith
- Receiver of the Year: JaMichael Palmer
- Offensive Lineman of the Year: Darron Sheppard
- Conference Freshman of the Year: Chris Miller

=== LSC First Team ===
- Alex Contreras, Defensive Back
- Nabil El-Amin, Running Back/Return Specialist
- Foaki Fifita, Linebacker
- A.J. Johnson, Defensive Line
- Elliot Jones, Defensive Back
- Deveon McKinney, Offensive Line
- JaMichael Palmer, Wide Receiver
- Luis Salazar, Offensive Line
- Darron Sheppard, Offensive Line
- Garnet Smith, Linebacker
- Marcus Smith, Defensive Line

=== LSC Second Team ===
- Terry Mayo, Quarterback
- Daniel Swaim, Punter

=== LSC Honorable Mention ===
- Trae Grimes, Fullback
