= 1954 McNeese State Cowboys football team =

American college football season

1954 McNeese State Cowboys football
- Conference: Gulf States Conference
- Record: 2–8 (1–5 GSC)
- Head coach: Albert I. Ratcliff (9th season)
- Home stadium: Wildcat Stadium

1954 Gulf States Conference football standings
	Conf.					Overall
Team	W		L		T	W		L		T
Southeastern Louisiana $	6	–	0	–	0	9	–	0	–	0
Northwestern State	4	–	2	–	0	7	–	2	–	0
Louisiana Tech	4	–	2	–	0	6	–	3	–	0
Southwestern Louisiana	4	–	2	–	0	5	–	4	–	0
Louisiana College	1	–	4	–	1	4	–	5	–	1
McNeese State	1	–	5	–	0	2	–	8	–	0
Northeast Louisiana State	0	–	5	–	1	1	–	8	–	1
$ – Conference champion

The 1954 McNeese State Cowboys football team was an American football team that represented McNeese State College (now known as McNeese State University) as a member of the Gulf States Conference (GSC) during the 1954 college football season. In their ninth year under head coach Albert I. Ratcliff, the team compiled an overall record of 2–8 with a mark of 1–5 in conference play, and finished sixth in the GSC.

== Schedule ==
Date	Opponent	Site	Result	Attendance	Source
September 18	Howard Payne*	Wildcat Stadium; Lake Charles, LA	L 7–38	5,000	
September 25	Stephen F. Austin*	Wildcat Stadium; Lake Charles, LA	L 13–40	3,500	
October 2	at Northwestern State	Demon Stadium; Natchitoches, LA (rivalry)	L 20–32	7,500	
October 9	at Louisiana Tech	Tech Stadium; Ruston, LA	L 10–21	8,000	
October 16	Louisiana College	Wildcat Stadium; Lake Charles, LA	L 0–28	5,500	
October 23	Northeast Louisiana State	Wildcat Stadium; Lake Charles, LA	W 27–6	600	
October 30	at Trinity (TX)*	Alamo Stadium; San Antonio, TX	L 0–68	7,500	
November 6	Texas Lutheran*	Wildcat Stadium; Lake Charles, LA	W 33–18	900	
November 13	at Southeastern Louisiana	Strawberry Stadium; Hammond, LA	L 6–50	6,500	
November 20	Southwestern Louisiana	Wildcat Stadium; Lake Charles, LA (rivalry)	L 12–55	4,500	
*Non-conference game
