= 1954 Louisiana Tech Bulldogs football team =

American college football season

1954 Louisiana Tech Bulldogs football
- Conference: Gulf States Conference
- Record: 6–3 (4–2 GSC)
- Head coach: Joe Aillet (14th season)
- Captains: James Oliver; Jessie Shorts
- Home stadium: Tech Stadium

1954 Gulf States Conference football standings
	Conf.					Overall
Team	W		L		T	W		L		T
Southeastern Louisiana $	6	–	0	–	0	9	–	0	–	0
Northwestern State	4	–	2	–	0	7	–	2	–	0
Louisiana Tech	4	–	2	–	0	6	–	3	–	0
Southwestern Louisiana	4	–	2	–	0	5	–	4	–	0
Louisiana College	1	–	4	–	1	4	–	5	–	1
McNeese State	1	–	5	–	0	2	–	8	–	0
Northeast Louisiana State	0	–	5	–	1	1	–	8	–	1
$ – Conference champion

The 1954 Louisiana Tech Bulldogs football team was an American football team that represented the Louisiana Polytechnic Institute (now known as Louisiana Tech University) as a member of the Gulf States Conference during the 1954 college football season. In their fourteenth year under head coach Joe Aillet, the team compiled a 6–3 record.

== Schedule ==
Date	Time	Opponent	Site	Result	Source
September 18		Louisiana College	Tech Stadium; Ruston, LA	W 27–0	
September 25		at Mississippi Southern*	Faulkner Field; Hattiesburg, MS (rivalry)	L 0–28	
October 9		McNeese State	Tech Stadium; Ruston, LA	W 21–10	
October 16	8:00 p.m.	Howard Payne*	Tech Stadium; Ruston, LA	W 13–7	
October 23		vs. Northwestern State	State Fair Stadium; Shreveport, LA (rivalry)	W 13–6	
October 30		at Southwestern Louisiana	McNaspy Stadium; Lafayette, LA (rivalry)	L 0–25	
November 6		Southeastern Louisiana	Tech Stadium; Ruston, LA	L 24–35	
November 13		Austin*	Tech Stadium; Ruston, LA	W 40–14	
November 20		at Northeast Louisiana State	Brown Stadium; Monroe, LA (rivalry)	W 51–6	
*Non-conference game; All times are in Central time
