= 1954 Lamar Tech Cardinals football team =

American college football season

1954 Lamar Tech Cardinals football
- Conference: Lone Star Conference
- Record: 3–7 (1–5 LSC)
- Head coach: James B. Higgins (2nd season)
- Home stadium: Greenie Stadium

1954 Lone Star Conference football standings
	Conf.					Overall
Team	W		L		T	W		L		T
Southwest Texas State +	5	–	0	–	1	6	–	3	–	1
East Texas State +	5	–	0	–	1	6	–	3	–	1
Stephen F. Austin	3	–	3	–	0	6	–	3	–	0
Sam Houston State	3	–	3	–	0	6	–	4	–	0
Texas A&I	2	–	4	–	0	6	–	5	–	0
Sul Ross	1	–	5	–	0	4	–	7	–	0
Lamar Tech	1	–	5	–	0	3	–	7	–	0
+ – Conference co-champions

The 1954 Lamar Tech Cardinals football team was an American football team that represented Lamar State College of Technology (now known as Lamar University) during the 1954 college football season as a member of the Lone Star Conference. In their second year under head coach James B. Higgins, the team compiled a 3–7 record.

== Schedule ==
Date	Opponent	Site	Result	Attendance	Source
September 18	at Southwestern Louisiana*	McNaspy Stadium; Lafayette, LA (rivalry)	W 26–20		
September 25	Northwestern State*	Greenie Stadium; Beaumont, TX	L 13–22		
October 2	McMurry*	Greenie Stadium; Beaumont, TX	W 19–13		
October 9	at Stephen F. Austin	Memorial Stadium; Nacogdoches, TX	L 7–20		
October 16	East Texas State	Greenie Stadium; Beaumont, TX	L 14–16		
October 23	Sam Houston State	Greenie Stadium; Beaumont, TX	W 6–0		
October 30	at Abilene Christian*	Fair Park Stadium; Abilene, TX	L 14–33		
November 6	at Southwest Texas State	Evans Field; San Marcos, TX	L 12–13	4,000	
November 13	Texas A&I*	Greenie Stadium; Beaumont, TX	L 14–18		
November 20	at Sul Ross	Jackson Field; Alpine, TX	L 13–27		
*Non-conference game
