= Guy Morriss =

American football player and coach (1951–2022)

Biographical details
- Born: May 13, 1951; Colorado City, Texas, U.S.
- Died: September 5, 2022 (aged 71); Danville, Kentucky, U.S.

Playing career
- 1969–1972: TCU
- 1973–1983: Philadelphia Eagles
- 1984–1987: New England Patriots
- Positions: Center, guard

Coaching career (HC unless noted)
- 1988–1989: New England Patriots (OL)
- 1991: Mansfield HS (TX) (OC)
- 1992: Washington Marauders
- 1992–1993: Valdosta State (OL)
- 1994: Arizona Cardinals (OL)
- 1995: San Antonio Texans (OL)
- 1996: Mississippi State (OL)
- 1997–2000: Kentucky (AHC/OL)
- 2001–2002: Kentucky
- 2003–2007: Baylor
- 2008: Kentucky State (OL)
- 2009–2012: Texas A&M–Commerce
- 2014: Warren Central HS (KY) (OL)
- 2015: Lexington Christian Academy (KY) (OL)

Head coaching record
- Overall: 37–85

Accomplishments and honors

Championships
- LSC North Division (2009)

Awards
- First-team All-SWC (1972)

Guy Walker Morriss (May 13, 1951 – September 5, 2022) was an American football coach and player. He served as the head football coach at the University of Kentucky for two seasons (2001–2002) and at Baylor University for five seasons (2003–2007).

Morriss played college football at Texas Christian University (TCU) and spent 15 seasons as an offensive lineman in the National Football League (NFL) with the Philadelphia Eagles (1973–1983) and the New England Patriots (1984–1987). Morriss played in over 200 regular season games during his NFL career and started at center for the Eagles in Super Bowl XV.

== Early life and playing career ==
Morriss was born in Colorado City, Texas, on May 13, 1951. He attended Sam Houston High School in Arlington, Texas, where he played tight end for the school's team. He later earned a scholarship to Texas Christian University (TCU) in Fort Worth, Texas, graduating in 1973 with a bachelor's degree in secondary education. He played as a guard for the TCU Horned Frogs.

The Philadelphia Eagles selected Morriss 28th overall in the second round of the 1973 NFL draft. As a rookie, the Eagles transitioned Morriss into a center. He played with the Eagles from 1973 to 1983, and started in 151 out of their 158 games in that period. In March 1984, the Eagles waived Morriss. He signed with the New England Patriots that offseason, and he played center and guard for the Patriots through the 1987 season. The Patriots waived Morriss before the 1988 season. He played in Super Bowl XV for the Eagles and as a backup to Pete Brock in Super Bowl XX for the Patriots.

== Coaching career ==
=== Early career ===
After he was waived, Morriss accepted a position with the Patriots as the offensive line coach for the 1988 season under Raymond Berry. In 1992, after a brief stint as the head coach of the Washington Marauders of the Professional Spring Football League, Morriss coached at Valdosta State University under Hal Mumme, who developed the modern air raid offense, and alongside Mike Leach. He later re-joined Mumme and Leach in 1997 at Kentucky, where he was offensive line and assistant head coach. Morriss was given national recognition for his pass blocking schemes that helped turn Kentucky's offense into one of the best in the nation.

=== Kentucky ===
After a recruiting scandal forced the resignation of Mumme at Kentucky, Morriss was named the school's interim head coach in 2001. After a 2–9 season, Kentucky named Morriss the school's permanent head coach, where he led the Wildcats to a 7–5 turnaround season in 2002.

Morriss was the losing coach in the "Bluegrass Miracle" game at Commonwealth Stadium in 2002. Morriss's Kentucky Wildcats kicked a field goal to take the lead over LSU with 11 seconds left, only to lose on an 80-yard Hail Mary pass as time expired. Seconds before the Hail Mary, Morriss was doused with Gatorade by quarterback Jared Lorenzen in a premature "victory bath".

=== Baylor ===
Morriss resigned from Kentucky to accept the head coaching job for the Baylor Bears in December 2002. Morriss took over a Baylor program that had a 17–61 overall record since joining the Big 12 Conference in 1996. Morriss's first season in 2003 was highlighted by an upset win over Colorado, a 19-point favorite. The team finished 3–9. Morriss's second season in 2004 again only led to three wins and one conference win, but Baylor had a 35–34 overtime upset win over #16 Texas A&M (a 25-point favorite), in which Morriss made a gutsy call to "go for two" to win in the first overtime, instead of kicking the extra point and forcing a second overtime. Morriss's third season in 2005 produced a 5–6 record (BU's best since 1995).

In 2006, Morriss's fourth year, BU had a disappointing 1–3 non-conference mark (including a loss at home to Army). BU rebounded with a 3–1 start in conference play. However, the momentum was stunted when quarterback Shawn Bell was injured in a loss to Texas A&M, and Baylor lost their final three games, finishing the year at 4–8 (3–5 in the Big 12).

In 2007, Morriss failed again to produce a winning record for the Bears, as Baylor finished with a 3–9 record. The loss of a significant number of seniors, including Bell, was part of the blame for the poor season. In the season opener, Baylor was shut out by TCU, 27–0, but managed to win the next three non-conference games. Afterwards, Baylor did not defeat any of its Big 12 opponents, their last defeat being the 12th consecutive loss in Big 12 play.

On November 18, 2007, Baylor fired Morriss. On November 28, 2007, former University of Houston head coach Art Briles replaced Morriss.

=== Kentucky State ===
In March 2008, Morriss accepted a job as a position coach at Kentucky State University. Morriss was the first person with coaching experience in a BCS conference to go to work in the Southern Intercollegiate Athletic Conference (a division II league consisting of historically black colleges and universities).

=== Texas A&M–Commerce ===
In December 2008, Scott Conley was removed as head coach of the Texas A&M–Commerce Lions football program after a 24–27 record in five seasons. On January 7, 2009, Morriss was offered the job to succeed Conley by athletic director Carlton Cooper and university president Daniel Jones.

Morriss's tenure at Texas A&M–Commerce began with five losses, before the Lions reeled off five straight wins, finishing 5–5 overall with a 5–0 record in their division, winning the North Division of the Lone Star Conference outright. Texas A&M–Commerce had its first division title since 2007 and its first outright title since 1990. Morriss also introduced the idea of wearing throwback jerseys that had the moniker "EAST TEXAS" on the front, as homage to the schools previous name, East Texas State University.

After Morriss's first season, players from his football team coordinated an effort to illegally remove all copies of a student newspaper from campus because it contained an unfavorable article about a teammate who had been arrested on drug charges. Morriss said that he was "proud" of his players for taking the newspapers. He also referred to the theft as "the best team building exercise we have ever done." Morriss was subsequently disciplined by the school administration over the incident.

The 2010 season started with much excitement as a massive renovation to Memorial Stadium in Commerce was completed that added 3,500 seats to the east side of the stadium, a second press box, a new scoreboard with a video jumbotron, and new locker rooms. The Lions christened their newly renovated stadium by routing Upper Iowa, 33–10, giving Morriss six straight wins as head coach. However, the Lions only won two more games the rest of the season and finished with a disappointing 3–8 season. The 2011 season only produced one win, a 60–28 win over Eastern New Mexico, and the Lions finished 1–9. 2012 produced an identical record of 1–9, the lone victory coming over long time rival Texas A&M–Kingsville, 21–14 in overtime.

On November 12, 2012, after leading the A&M–Commerce football program for four seasons, Morriss stepped down as head football coach. He stayed on at A&M–Commerce as special assistant to the athletic director. His duties included fundraising, teaching, and oversight of athletic facilities and special projects.

== Personal life ==
Morriss was married to Jackie Morriss until his death. Together, they had four daughters and five grandchildren. Despite living in Kentucky, he was known to be proud of his Texas heritage. His first comment to the press when accepting the Baylor job was yelling "It's good to be back in the Lone Star."

Morriss was inducted into the Kentucky Pro Football Hall of Fame in 2018.

In 2017, Morriss was diagnosed with Alzheimer's disease. He died in Danville, Kentucky, on September 5, 2022, at the age of 71.

== Head coaching record ==
Year	Team	Overall	Conference	Standing	Bowl/playoffs
Kentucky Wildcats (Southeastern Conference) (2001–2002)
2001	Kentucky	2–9	1–7	5th (Eastern)	
2002	Kentucky	7–5	3–5	T–4th (Eastern)	
Kentucky:		9–14	4–12		
Baylor Bears (Big 12 Conference) (2003–2007)
2003	Baylor	3–9	1–7	6th (South)	
2004	Baylor	3–8	1–7	6th (South)	
2005	Baylor	5–6	2–6	5th (South)	
2006	Baylor	4–8	3–5	T–5th (South)	
2007	Baylor	3–9	0–8	6th (South)	
Baylor:		18–40	7–33		
Texas A&M–Commerce Lions (Lone Star Conference) (2009–2012)
2009	Texas A&M–Commerce	5–5	5–4	T–1st (North)	
2010	Texas A&M–Commerce	3–8	2–8	T–6th (North)	
2011	Texas A&M–Commerce	1–9	1–7	T–8th	
2012	Texas A&M–Commerce	1–9	1–7	T–8th	
Texas A&M–Commerce:		10–31	9–26		
Total:		37–85			
National championship Conference title Conference division title or championship game berth
