= 1954 Southwestern Louisiana Bulldogs football team =

American college football season

1954 Southwestern Louisiana Bulldogs football
- Conference: Gulf States Conference
- Record: 5–4 (4–2 GSC)
- Head coach: Raymond Didier (4th season)
- Home stadium: McNaspy Stadium

1954 Gulf States Conference football standings
	Conf.					Overall
Team	W		L		T	W		L		T
Southeastern Louisiana $	6	–	0	–	0	9	–	0	–	0
Northwestern State	4	–	2	–	0	7	–	2	–	0
Louisiana Tech	4	–	2	–	0	6	–	3	–	0
Southwestern Louisiana	4	–	2	–	0	5	–	4	–	0
Louisiana College	1	–	4	–	1	4	–	5	–	1
McNeese State	1	–	5	–	0	2	–	8	–	0
Northeast Louisiana State	0	–	5	–	1	1	–	8	–	1
$ – Conference champion

The 1954 Southwestern Louisiana Bulldogs football team was an American football team that represented the Southwestern Louisiana Institute of Liberal and Technical Learning (now known as the University of Louisiana at Lafayette) in the Gulf States Conference during the 1954 college football season. In their fourth year under head coach Raymond Didier, the team compiled a 5–4 record.

== Schedule ==
Date	Opponent	Site	Result	Attendance	Source
September 18	Lamar Tech*	McNaspy Stadium; Lafayette, LA (rivalry)	L 20–26		
September 25	Southeastern Louisiana	McNaspy Stadium; Lafayette, LA (rivalry)	L 0–32	6,000	
October 2	at East Texas State*	Memorial Stadium; Commerce, TX	L 13–33	4,000	
October 9	Northeast Louisiana State	McNaspy Stadium; Lafayette, LA (rivalry)	W 41–7		
October 16	Arkansas State*	McNaspy Stadium; Lafayette, LA	W 36–2		
October 30	Louisiana Tech	McNaspy Stadium; Lafayette, LA (rivalry)	W 25–0		
November 6	at Louisiana College	Alumni Stadium; Pineville, LA	W 25–13	4,000	
November 13	at Northwestern State	Demon Stadium; Natchitoches, LA	L 7–34		
November 20	at McNeese State	Wildcat Stadium; Lake Charles, LA (rivalry)	W 55–12	4,500	
*Non-conference game
