= 2007 West Texas A&M Buffaloes football team =

American college football season

2007 West Texas A&M Buffaloes football

LSC South Division champion LSC champion

NCAA Division II Second Round, L 28–56 vs. Northwest Missouri State
- Conference: Lone Star Conference
- South Division

Ranking
- AFCA: No. 8
- Record: 12–1 (9–0 LSC)
- Head coach: Don Carthel (3rd season)
- Offensive coordinator: Scott Parr (2nd season)
- Offensive scheme: Air raid
- Defensive coordinator: Colby Carthel (2nd season)
- Base defense: 3–4
- Home stadium: Kimbrough Memorial Stadium

2007 Lone Star Conference football standings
	Conf.			Overall
Team	W		L	W		L
Overall*
No. 8 W. Texas A&M $^	9	–	0	12	–	1
No. 15 Abilene Christian ^†	8	–	1	10	–	3
No. 21 Tarleton State	7	–	2	9	–	2
No. 25 Midwestern State	6	–	3	8	–	3
Texas A&M–Commerce	5	–	4	5	–	6
SW Oklahoma State	4	–	5	6	–	5
Central Oklahoma	4	–	5	4	–	6
Eastern New Mexico	3	–	6	5	–	6
SE Oklahoma State	3	–	6	4	–	6
Northeastern State	3	–	6	3	–	7
Texas A&M–Kingsville	3	–	6	3	–	8
Angelo State	2	–	7	2	–	8
East Central	2	–	7	2	–	9
North Division
SW Oklahoma State x	3	–	2	6	–	5
Texas A&M–Commerce x	3	–	2	5	–	6
SE Oklahoma State x	3	–	2	4	–	6
Central Oklahoma x	3	–	2	4	–	6
Northeastern State x	3	–	2	3	–	7
East Central	0	–	5	2	–	9
South Division
No. 8 W. Texas A&M $^	6	–	0	12	–	1
No. 15 Abilene Christian ^†	5	–	1	10	–	3
No. 21 Tarleton State	4	–	2	9	–	2
No. 25 Midwestern State	3	–	3	8	–	3
Texas A&M–Kingsville	2	–	4	3	–	8
Angelo State	1	–	5	2	–	8
Eastern New Mexico	0	–	6	5	–	6
$ – Conference champion; ^ – NCAA Division II playoff participant; * – The LSC counted separate overall and division standings. † – Abilene Christian vacated all ten wins.; Rankings from AFCA Poll

The 2007 West Texas A&M Buffaloes football team represented West Texas A&M University (WTAMU or WT) during the 2007 NCAA Division II football season as a member of the Lone Star Conference (LSC). The Buffaloes were led by third-year head coach Don Carthel and played their home games at Kimbrough Memorial Stadium in Canyon, Texas.

For the third season in-a-row, the Buffs won both the LSC South Division title and the LSC conference title. WT received a bid to the Division II playoffs, losing 28–56 to no. 5 Northwest Missouri State in the Second Round.

== Schedule ==
Date	Time	Opponent	Rank	Site	Result
August 30	7:00 p.m.	No. 8 South Dakota*	No. 24	Kimbrough Memorial Stadium; Canyon, TX	W 55–45
September 8	2:00 p.m.	Adams State*	No. 17	Rex Stadium; Alamosa, CO	W 63–20
September 15	6:00 p.m.	Texas A&M–Commerce	No. 14	Kimbrough Memorial Stadium; Canyon, TX (East Texas vs. West Texas)	W 45–14
September 22	7:00 p.m.	at Northeastern State	No. 12	Doc Wadley Stadium; Tahlequah, OK	W 38–0
September 29	6:00 p.m.	Texas A&M–Kingsville	No. 11	Kimbrough Memorial Stadium; Canyon, TX	W 36–3
October 6	7:00 p.m.	at No. 12 Midwestern State	No. 10	Memorial Stadium; Wichita Falls, TX	W 25–20
October 13	6:00 p.m.	Eastern New Mexico^{†}	No. 10	Kimbrough Memorial Stadium; Canyon, TX (Wagon Wheel)	W 62–31
October 20	2:00 p.m.	at No. 12 Abilene Christian	No. 6	Shotwell Stadium; Abilene, TX	W 41–31
October 27	6:00 p.m.	Angelo State	No. 5	Kimbrough Memorial Stadium; Canyon, TX	W 38–17
November 3	6:00 p.m.	Central Oklahoma	No. 4	Kimbrough Memorial Stadium; Canyon, TX	W 31–0
November 10	7:00 p.m.	at No. 13 Tarleton State	No. 4	Memorial Stadium; Stephenville, TX	W 39–14
November 17	1:00 p.m.	No. 25 Washburn*	No. 4	Kimbrough Memorial Stadium; Canyon, TX (NCAA Division II First Round)	W 40–39
November 24	12:00 p.m.	at No. 5 Northwest Missouri State*	No. 4	Bearcat Stadium; Maryville, MO (NCAA Division II Second Round)	L 28–56
*Non-conference game; ^{†}Homecoming; Rankings from AFCA Poll released prior to the game; All times are in Central time

== Rankings ==
Ranking movements Legend: ██ Increase in ranking ██ Decrease in ranking
	Week													
Poll	Pre	1	2	3	4	5	6	7	8	9	10	11	12	Final
AFCA	24	24	17	14	12	11	10	10	6	5	4	4	4	8

== Game summaries ==
=== No. 8 South Dakota ===
	1	2	3	4	Total
No. 8 Coyotes	3	21	6	15	45
No. 24 Buffaloes	17	16	15	7	55

=== Texas A&M–Commerce ===
	1	2	3	4	Total
Lions	0	7	0	7	14
No. 14 Buffaloes	10	14	7	14	45

=== At No. 12 Midwestern State ===
	1	2	3	4	Total
No. 10 Buffaloes	7	7	0	11	25
No. 12 Mustangs	7	3	3	7	20

=== Eastern New Mexico ===
	1	2	3	4	Total
Greyhounds	3	7	14	7	31
No. 10 Buffaloes	10	24	28	0	62

=== Angelo State ===
	1	2	3	4	Total
Rams	0	0	3	14	17
No. 5 Buffaloes	7	10	14	7	38

=== No. 25 Washburn (NCAA Division II First Round) ===
	1	2	3	4	Total
No. 25 Ichabods	7	7	15	10	39
No. 4 Buffaloes	0	0	28	12	40

=== At No. 5 Northwest Missouri State (NCAA Division II Second Round) ===
	1	2	3	4	Total
No. 4 Buffaloes	7	14	0	7	28
No. 5 Bearcats	21	14	14	7	56
