= 1954 Howard Payne Yellow Jackets football team =

American college football season

1954 Howard Payne Yellow Jackets football

Texas Conference champion
- Conference: Texas Conference
- Record: 9–1 (2–0 Texas)
- Head coach: Guy B. Gardner (2nd season)
- Home stadium: Lion Stadium

1954 Texas Conference football standings
	Conf.					Overall
Team	W		L		T	W		L		T
Howard Payne $	2	–	0	–	0	9	–	1	–	0
McMurry	1	–	1	–	0	6	–	3	–	1
Eastern New Mexico	0	–	2	–	0	6	–	3	–	0
$ – Conference champion

The 1954 Howard Payne Yellow Jackets was an American football team that represented Howard Payne College—now known as Howard Payne University—as a member of the Texas Conference during the 1954 college football season. Led by second-year head coach Guy B. Gardner, the Yellow Jackets compiled an overall record of 9–1 with a mark of 2–0 in conference play, winning the Texas Conference title.

== Schedule ==
Date	Time	Opponent	Site	Result	Attendance	Source
September 18		at McNeese State*	Wildcat Stadium; Lake Charles, LA	W 38–7	4,500	
September 25		Sam Houston State*	Lion Stadium; Brownwood, TX	W 13–7		
October 2		Southwest Texas State*	Lion Stadium; Brownwood, TX	W 28–13	4,200	
October 8		at New Mexico A&M*	Memorial Stadium; Las Cruces, NM	W 34–7	3,000	
October 16	8:00 p.m.	at Louisiana Tech*	Tech Stadium; Ruston, LA	L 7–13		
October 23		Eastern New Mexico	Lion Stadium; Brownwood, TX	W 38–13		
October 30		Corpus Christi*	Lion Stadium; Brownwood, TX	W 53–7		
November 6		McMurry^{†}	Lion Stadium; Brownwood, TX	W 13–6	5,000	
November 13		at Sul Ross*	Alpine, TX	W 20–2		
November 25	2:00 p.m.	at Abilene Christian*	Fair Park Stadium; Abilene, TX	W 26–13	6,000	
*Non-conference game; ^{†}Homecoming; All times are in Central time
