= 2007 Tuskegee Golden Tigers football team =

American college football season

2007 Tuskegee Golden Tigers football

Black college national champion SIAC champion

Pioneer Bowl, W 58–51 vs. Virginia Union
- Conference: Southern Intercollegiate Athletic Conference

Ranking
- AFCA: No. 16
- Record: 12–0 (7–0 SIAC)
- Head coach: Willie J. Slater (2nd season)
- Home stadium: Abbott Memorial Alumni Stadium

2007 Southern Intercollegiate Athletic Conference football standings
	Conf.			Overall
Team	W		L	W		L
No. 16 Tuskegee # $	7	–	0	12	–	0
Albany State ^	6	–	1	8	–	3
Fort Valley State	5	–	2	8	–	3
Morehouse	4	–	3	7	–	3
Lane	4	–	3	7	–	3
Stillman	3	–	4	7	–	4
Kentucky State	3	–	4	3	–	8
Clark Atlanta	2	–	5	3	–	8
Benedict	1	–	6	2	–	9
Miles	0	–	7	2	–	9
$ – Conference champion; ^ – NCAA Division II playoff participant; # – Pioneer Bowl participant; Rankings from AFCA poll

The 2007 Tuskegee Golden Tigers football team represented Tuskegee University as a member of the Southern Intercollegiate Athletic Conference (SIAC) during the 2007 NCAA Division II football season. Led by second-year head coach Willie J. Slater, the Golden Tigers compiled an overall record of 12–0, with a conference record of 7–0, and finished as SIAC co-champion. At the conclusion of the season, the Golden Tigers were also recognized as black college national champion.

== Schedule ==
Date	Opponent	Site	Result	Attendance	Source
September 2	at Miles	Legion Field; Birmingham, AL	W 40–6	39,583	
September 15	at Benedict	Charlie W. Johnson Stadium; Columbia, SC	W 44–8		
September 22	Fort Valley State	Abbott Memorial Alumni Stadium; Tuskegee, AL	W 34–3		
September 29	Concordia (AL)*	Abbott Memorial Alumni Stadium; Tuskegee, AL	W 42–9		
October 6	vs. Morehouse	Memorial Stadium; Columbus, GA (Tuskegee–Morehouse Football Classic)	W 33–10		
October 13	Stillman	Abbott Memorial Alumni Stadium; Tuskegee, AL	W 35–7		
October 20	at Albany State	Albany State University Coliseum; Albany, GA	W 40–28		
October 27	at Kentucky State	Alumni Field; Frankfort, KY	W 49–10		
November 3	Clark Atlanta^{†}	Abbott Memorial Alumni Stadium; Tuskegee, AL	W 51–0		
November 10	George Mason*	Abbott Memorial Alumni Stadium; Tuskegee, AL	W 72–3		
November 22	at Alabama State*	Cramton Bowl; Montgomery, AL (Turkey Day Classic)	W 64–58 ^{3OT}		
December 1	vs. Virginia Union*	Charlie W. Johnson Stadium; Columbia, SC (Pioneer Bowl)	W 58–51		
*Non-conference game; ^{†}Homecoming
