= 1954 Northeast Louisiana State Indians football team =

American college football season

1954 Northeast Louisiana State Indians football
- Conference: Gulf States Conference
- Record: 1–8–1 (0–5–1 GSC)
- Head coach: Devone Payne (1st season)
- Home stadium: Brown Stadium

1954 Gulf States Conference football standings
	Conf.					Overall
Team	W		L		T	W		L		T
Southeastern Louisiana $	6	–	0	–	0	9	–	0	–	0
Northwestern State	4	–	2	–	0	7	–	2	–	0
Louisiana Tech	4	–	2	–	0	6	–	3	–	0
Southwestern Louisiana	4	–	2	–	0	5	–	4	–	0
Louisiana College	1	–	4	–	1	4	–	5	–	1
McNeese State	1	–	5	–	0	2	–	8	–	0
Northeast Louisiana State	0	–	5	–	1	1	–	8	–	1
$ – Conference champion

The 1954 Northeast Louisiana State Indians football team was an American football team that represented Northeast Louisiana State College (now known as the University of Louisiana at Monroe) in the Gulf States Conference during the 1954 college football season. In their first year under head coach Devone Payne, the team compiled a 1–8–1 record.

== Schedule ==
Date	Opponent	Site	Result	Attendance	Source
September 18	at Southeastern Louisiana	Strawberry Stadium; Hammond, LA	L 0–58		
September 25	Texas A&I*	Brown Stadium; Monroe, LA	L 12–13		
October 2	at Delta State*	Delta Field; Cleveland, MS	L 12–30		
October 9	at Southwestern Louisiana	McNaspy Stadium; Lafayette, LA (rivalry)	L 7–41	6,500	
October 16	at Western Kentucky*	Bowling Green, KY	L 7–19		
October 23	at McNeese State	Wildcat Stadium; Lake Charles, LA	L 6–27		
October 30	Livingston State*	Brown Stadium; Monroe, LA	W 44–28		
November 6	Northwestern State	Brown Stadium; Monroe, LA (rivalry)	L 6–51		
November 13	at Louisiana College	Alumni Stadium; Pineville, LA	T 19–19		
November 20	Louisiana Tech	Brown Stadium; Monroe, LA (rivalry)	L 6–51		
*Non-conference game
