= 2007 Bryant Bulldogs football team =

American college football season

2007 Bryant Bulldogs football

NE-10 champion

NCAA Division II First Round, L 28–45 at Southern Connecticut
- Conference: Northeast-10 Conference
- Record: 8–3 (8–1 NE-10)
- Head coach: Marty Fine (4th season)
- Defensive coordinator: Greg Gigantino (1st season)
- Home stadium: Bulldog Stadium

2007 Northeast-10 Conference football standings
	Conf.			Overall
Team	W		L	W		L
Bryant $^	8	–	1	8	–	3
American International	7	–	2	7	–	3
Southern Connecticut ^	7	–	2	9	–	4
Bentley	6	–	3	7	–	3
Stonehill	5	–	4	5	–	5
C. W. Post	4	–	5	4	–	6
Merrimack	4	–	5	4	–	6
Assumption	3	–	6	4	–	7
Pace	1	–	8	1	–	10
Saint Anselm	0	–	9	0	–	10
+ – Conference co-champions; ^ – NCAA Division II playoff participant

The 2007 Bryant Bulldogs football team represented Bryant University as a member of Northeast-10 Conference (NE-10) during the 2007 NCAA Division II football season. The Bulldogs were led by fourth-year head coach Marty Fine and played their home games at Bulldog Stadium. They finished the season 8–3 overall and 8–1 in NE-10 play.

== Schedule ==
Date	Opponent	Site	Result	Attendance
September 8	American International	Bulldog Stadium; Smithfield, RI	W 13–6	2,242
September 14	at Merrimack	Warrior Field; North Andover, MA	W 37–34 ^{OT}	2,341
September 22	at Assumption	Multi-sport Stadium; Worcester, MA	W 38–28	1,356
September 29	Pace	Bulldog Stadium; Smithfield, RI	W 22–19	3,317
October 6	at C. W. Post	Hickox Field; Brookville, NY	W 24–17	4,700
October 13	Stonehill	Bulldog Stadium; Smithfield, RI	W 34–6	5,434
October 20	at Saint Anselm	Grappone Stadium; Goffstown, NH	W 49–21	1,938
October 27	at Stony Brook*	Kenneth P. LaValle Stadium; Stony Brook, NY	L 0–30	2,238
November 2	at Southern Connecticut	Jess Dow Field; New Haven, CT	L 28–56	1,419
November 4	Bentley	Bulldog Stadium; Smithfield, RI	W 29–3	4,748
November 17	at Southern Connecticut*	Jess Dow Field; New Haven, CT (NCAA Division II First Round)	L 28–45	2,011
*Non-conference game
