= 1954 Sam Houston State Bearkats football team =

American college football season

1954 Sam Houston State Bearkats football
- Conference: Lone Star Conference
- Record: 6–4 (3–3 LSC)
- Head coach: Paul Pierce (3rd season)
- Home stadium: Pritchett Field

1954 Lone Star Conference football standings
| | Conf. | | | | | Overall |
| Team | W | | L | | T | W | | L | | T |
|---|---|---|---|---|---|---|---|---|---|---|
| Southwest Texas State + | 5 | – | 0 | – | 1 | 6 | – | 3 | – | 1 |
| East Texas State + | 5 | – | 0 | – | 1 | 6 | – | 3 | – | 1 |
| Stephen F. Austin | 3 | – | 3 | – | 0 | 6 | – | 3 | – | 0 |
| Sam Houston State | 3 | – | 3 | – | 0 | 6 | – | 4 | – | 0 |
| Texas A&I | 2 | – | 4 | – | 0 | 6 | – | 5 | – | 0 |
| Sul Ross | 1 | – | 5 | – | 0 | 4 | – | 7 | – | 0 |
| Lamar Tech | 1 | – | 5 | – | 0 | 3 | – | 7 | – | 0 |
+ – Conference co-champions

The 1954 Sam Houston State Bearkats football team represented Sam Houston State Teachers College (now known as Sam Houston State University) as a member of the Lone Star Conference (LSC) during the 1954 college football season. Led by third-year head coach Paul Pierce, the Bearkats compiled an overall record of 6–4 with a mark of 2–3 in conference play, and finished tied for third in the LSC.

== Schedule ==
| Date | Opponent | Site | Result | Attendance | Source |
|---|---|---|---|---|---|
| September 18 | Corpus Christi* | Pritchett Field; Huntsville, TX | W 33–6 | | |
| September 25 | at Howard Payne* | Lion Field; Brownwood, TX | L 7–13 | | |
| October 2 | Texas Lutheran* | Pritchett Field; Huntsville, TX | W 46–0 | | |
| October 9 | at Sul Ross | Jackson Field; Alpine, TX | W 38–21 | | |
| October 16 | Texas A&I | Pritchett Field; Huntsville, TX | W 14–0 | | |
| October 23 | at Lamar Tech | Greenie Stadium; Beaumont, TX | L 0–6 | | |
| October 30 | at East Texas State | Memorial Stadium; Commerce, TX | L 14–20 | 7,500 | |
| November 6 | Eastern New Mexico* | Pritchett Field; Huntsville, TX | W 26–13 | | |
| November 13 | Southwest Texas State | Pritchett Field; Huntsville, TX | L 22–26 | | |
| November 20 | Stephen F. Austin | Pritchett Field; Huntsville, TX (rivalry) | W 42–25 | | |
*Non-conference game
