= 1954 East Texas State Lions football team =

American college football season

1954 East Texas State Lions football

LSC co-champion
- Conference: Lone Star Conference
- Record: 6–3–1 (5–0–1 LSC)
- Head coach: Jules V. Sikes (1st season)
- Home stadium: Memorial Stadium

1954 Lone Star Conference football standings
	Conf.					Overall
Team	W		L		T	W		L		T
Southwest Texas State +	5	–	0	–	1	6	–	3	–	1
East Texas State +	5	–	0	–	1	6	–	3	–	1
Stephen F. Austin	3	–	3	–	0	6	–	3	–	0
Sam Houston State	3	–	3	–	0	6	–	4	–	0
Texas A&I	2	–	4	–	0	6	–	5	–	0
Sul Ross	1	–	5	–	0	4	–	7	–	0
Lamar Tech	1	–	5	–	0	3	–	7	–	0
+ – Conference co-champions

The 1954 East Texas State Lions football team was an American football team that represented East Texas State Teachers College—now known as East Texas A&M University–as a member of the Lone Star Conference (LSC) during the 1954 college football season. Led by first-year head coach Jules V. Sikes, the Lions compiled an overall record of 6–3–1 with a mark of 5–0–1 in conference play, sharing the LSC title with Southwest Texas State.

== Schedule ==
Date	Opponent	Site	Result	Attendance	Source
September 18	at Abilene Christian*	Fair Park Stadium; Abilene, TX	L 19–41	6,000	
October 2	Southwestern Louisiana*	Memorial Stadium; Commerce, TX	W 33–13	4,000	
October 9	Trinity (TX)*	Memorial Stadium; Commerce, TX	L 0–6		
October 16	at Lamar Tech	Beaumont, TX	W 16–14		
October 22	at Chattanooga*	Chamberlain Field; Chattanooga, TN	L 6–41	7,000	
October 30	Sam Houston State^{†}	Memorial Stadium; Commerce, TX	W 20–14	7,500	
November 6	at Texas A&I	Javelina Stadium; Kingsville, TX	W 26–6	5,500	
November 13	at Stephen F. Austin	Memorial Stadium; Nacogdoches, TX	W 25–21	6,000	
November 20	Southwest Texas State	Memorial Stadium; Commerce, TX	T 7–7		
November 25	Sul Ross	Memorial Stadium; Commerce, TX	W 27–6		
*Non-conference game; ^{†}Homecoming
