= Jules V. Sikes =

American athlete and coach (1904–1964)

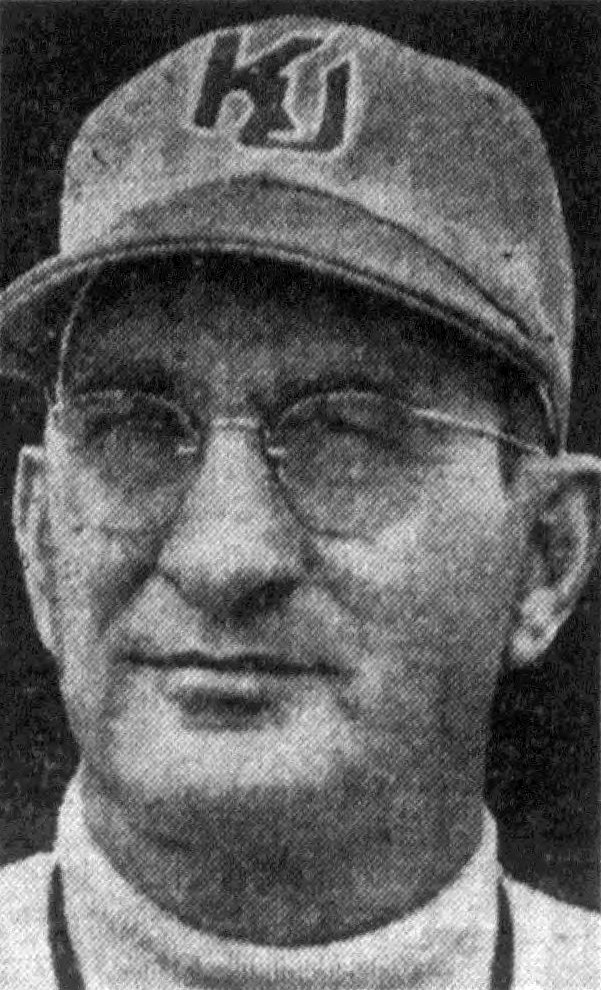
- Sikes, c. 1953

Biographical details
- Born: October 22, 1904; Leonard, Texas, U.S.
- Died: May 20, 1964 (aged 59); Commerce, Texas, U.S.

Playing career

Football
- 1925–1927: Texas A&M

Basketball
- 1926–1928: Texas A&M

Baseball
- 1926–1928: Texas A&M
- Position: End (football)

Coaching career (HC unless noted)

Football
- 1928: Blinn
- 1929–1930: Burleson
- 1935–1937: Texas A&M (assistant)
- 1938–1942: Georgia (ends)
- 1943: Saint Mary's Pre-Flight (assistant)
- 1944: Saint Mary's Pre-Flight
- 1945–1947: Georgia (ends)
- 1948–1953: Kansas
- 1954–1963: East Texas State

Basketball
- 1928–1929: Blinn
- 1930–1931: East Texas State (freshmen)
- 1931–1935: East Texas State

Baseball
- 1929: Blinn
- 1936–1937: Texas A&M
- 1938–1942: Georgia
- 1946–1947: Georgia

Head coaching record
- Overall: 102–63–4 (college football); 36–37 (college basketball); 126–79–3 (college baseball)
- Bowls: 2–0

Accomplishments and honors

Championships
- Football; 5 LSC (1954–1955, 1957–1959) Baseball; 1 SWC (1937)

Awards
- First-team All-SWC (1927)

Jules Verne "Siki" Sikes (October 22, 1904 – May 20, 1964) was an American football, basketball, and baseball player and coach. He was a graduate of Texas A&M University where he was a three-sport star, lettering three years each in baseball, basketball and football. He played end for Dana X. Bible's Texas A&M football teams from 1925 to 1927 and was All-Southwest Conference and mentioned as All-American. He played minor league baseball with Shreveport, Louisiana of the Class A Texas League after college. Sikes was an assistant coach for ends at the University of Georgia in Wally Butts first year as head football coach in 1939 until leaving for Kansas after the 1947 season, interrupted by service in World War II. He coached the Kansas Jayhawks from 1948 to 1953, compiling a 35–25 record. He succeeded George Sauer who left Kansas for United States Naval Academy. From 1954 to 1963, he coached at East Texas State University, amassing a 63–34–4 record. The Lions won five Lone Star Conference championships during his tenure and won both the Tangerine Bowl twice, at the end of the 1957 and 1958 seasons. He was a proponent of the T formation.

Sikes died on May 20, 1964, in Commerce, Texas, after collapsing on the golf course at East Texas State.

== Head coaching record ==
=== College football ===
Year	Team	Overall	Conference	Standing	Bowl/playoffs	Coaches^{#}	AP^{°}
Saint Mary's Pre-Flight (Independent) (1944)
1944	Saint Mary's Pre-Flight	4–4					19
Saint Mary's Pre-Flight:		4–4					
Kansas Jayhawks (Big Seven Conference) (1948–1953)
1948	Kansas	7–3	4–2	3rd			
1949	Kansas	5–5	2–4	5th			
1950	Kansas	6–4	3–3	4th			
1951	Kansas	8–2	4–2	3rd		20	
1952	Kansas	7–3	3–3	4th			
1953	Kansas	2–8	2–4	T–4th			
Kansas:		35–25	18–18				
East Texas State Lions (Lone Star Conference) (1954–1963)
1954	East Texas State	6–3–1	5–0–1	T–1st			
1955	East Texas State	5–4–1	5–1	T–1st			
1956	East Texas State	2–8	1–5	6th			
1957	East Texas State	9–1	6–1	1st	W Tangerine		
1958	East Texas State	10–1	6–1	1st	W Tangerine		
1959	East Texas State	9–1	6–1	T–1st			
1960	East Texas State	6–4	5–2	T–2nd			
1961	East Texas State	3–6	3–4	5th			
1962	East Texas State	5–4–1	3–3–1	5th			
1963	East Texas State	7–2–1	4–2	T–2nd			
East Texas State:		63–34–4	46–20–2				
Total:		102–63–4					
National championship Conference title Conference division title or championship game berth
