= 1954 Southwest Texas State Bobcats football team =

American college football season

1954 Southwest Texas State Bobcats football

LSC co-champion
- Conference: Lone Star Conference
- Record: 6–3–1 (5–0–1 LSC)
- Head coach: R. W. Parker (1st season)
- Home stadium: Evans Field

1954 Lone Star Conference football standings
	Conf.					Overall
Team	W		L		T	W		L		T
Southwest Texas State +	5	–	0	–	1	6	–	3	–	1
East Texas State +	5	–	0	–	1	6	–	3	–	1
Stephen F. Austin	3	–	3	–	0	6	–	3	–	0
Sam Houston State	3	–	3	–	0	6	–	4	–	0
Texas A&I	2	–	4	–	0	6	–	5	–	0
Sul Ross	1	–	5	–	0	4	–	7	–	0
Lamar Tech	1	–	5	–	0	3	–	7	–	0
+ – Conference co-champions

The 1954 Southwest Texas State Bobcats football team was an American football team that represented Southwest Texas State Teachers College—now known as Texas State University–as a member of the Lone Star Conference (LSC) during the 1954 college football season. Led by first-year head coach R. W. Parker, the Bobcats compiled an overall record of 6–3–1 and a mark of 5–0–1 in conference play, sharing the LSC title with East Texas State.

== Schedule ==
Date	Time	Opponent	Site	Result	Attendance	Source
September 11	8:00 p.m.	Brooke Army Medical Center*	Evans Field; San Marcos, TX	L 13–34	3,500	
September 18	8:00 p.m.	Trinity (TX)*	Evans Field; San Marcos, TX	L 7–26		
September 25		Texas Lutheran*	Evans Field; San Marcos, TX	W 20–6	3,000	
October 2		at Howard Payne*	Lion Stadium; Brownwood, TX	L 13–28	4,200	
October 9		at Texas A&I	Javelina Stadium; Kingsville, TX	W 21–16	5,000	
October 16	8:00 p.m.	Sul Ross	Evans Field; San Marcos, TX	W 33–13		
October 23		Stephen F. Austin	Evans Field; San Marcos, TX	W 7–6		
November 6	2:30 p.m.	Lamar Tech^{†}	Evans Field; San Marcos, TX	W 13–12	4,000	
November 13		at Sam Houston State	Pritchett Field; Huntsville, TX (rivalry)	W 26–22		
November 20		at East Texas State	Memorial Stadium; Commerce, TX	T 7–7		
*Non-conference game; ^{†}Homecoming; All times are in Central time
