= East Texas A&M Lions football =

College football program

2026 East Texas A&M Lions football team
- First season: 1915; 111 years ago
- Head coach: Clint Dolezel; 4th season, 7–27 (.206)
- Location: Commerce, Texas
- Stadium: Ernest Hawkins Field at Memorial Stadium (capacity: 13,500)
- NCAA division: Division I FCS
- Conference: Southland
- Colors: Blue and gold
- All-time record: 542–435–30 (.553)
- Bowl record: 18–8–2 (.679)

NCAA Division II championships
- 2017

NAIA national championships
- NAIA Division I: 1972

Conference championships
- LSC: 1933, 1934, 1935, 1937, 1938, 1942, 1949, 1951, 1952, 1953, 1954, 1955, 1957, 1958, 1959, 1966, 1969, 1972, 1983, 1990, 2014, 2015, 2016

Division championships
- LSC North: 2007, 2009
- Rivalries: Tarleton State; Texas A&M–Kingsville; West Texas A&M
- Mascot: Lucky the Lion
- Marching band: Pride Marching Band
- Website: LionAthletics.com

The East Texas A&M Lions football team (formerly the East Texas State Lions and the Texas A&M–Commerce Lions) is the college football program representing East Texas A&M University. The school competes in the Southland Conference (SLC) in Division I FCS of the National Collegiate Athletic Association (NCAA). Prior to joining the Southland, they competed in the Lone Star Conference of Division II. The East Texas A&M football team plays its home games at Ernest Hawkins Field at Memorial Stadium on the university campus in Commerce, Texas. On December 16, 2017, East Texas A&M (then A&M-Commerce) won its first NCAA Division II national championship, by defeating West Florida, 37–27, in Kansas City. The Lions recorded a perfect record in 1934, won the NAIA National Championship in 1972, and have amassed a total of 24 LSC conference championships since joining as a charter member in 1931. On September 28, 2021, the university accepted an invitation from the Southland Conference, moving the university's athletics programs up to the NCAA Division I level. This ended a 90-year affiliation with the Lone Star Conference, as East Texas A&M was the last founding member remaining. The football team began competing at the NCAA Division I Football Championship Subdivision level starting with the 2022 season.

The school, which has fielded football teams since 1915, has produced numerous National Football League players, including Autry Beamon, Dee Mackey, Harvey Martin, Alan Veingrad, Dwight White, and Wade Wilson.

The program is currently coached by Clint Dolezel.

== History ==
=== Formative years (1915–1919) ===
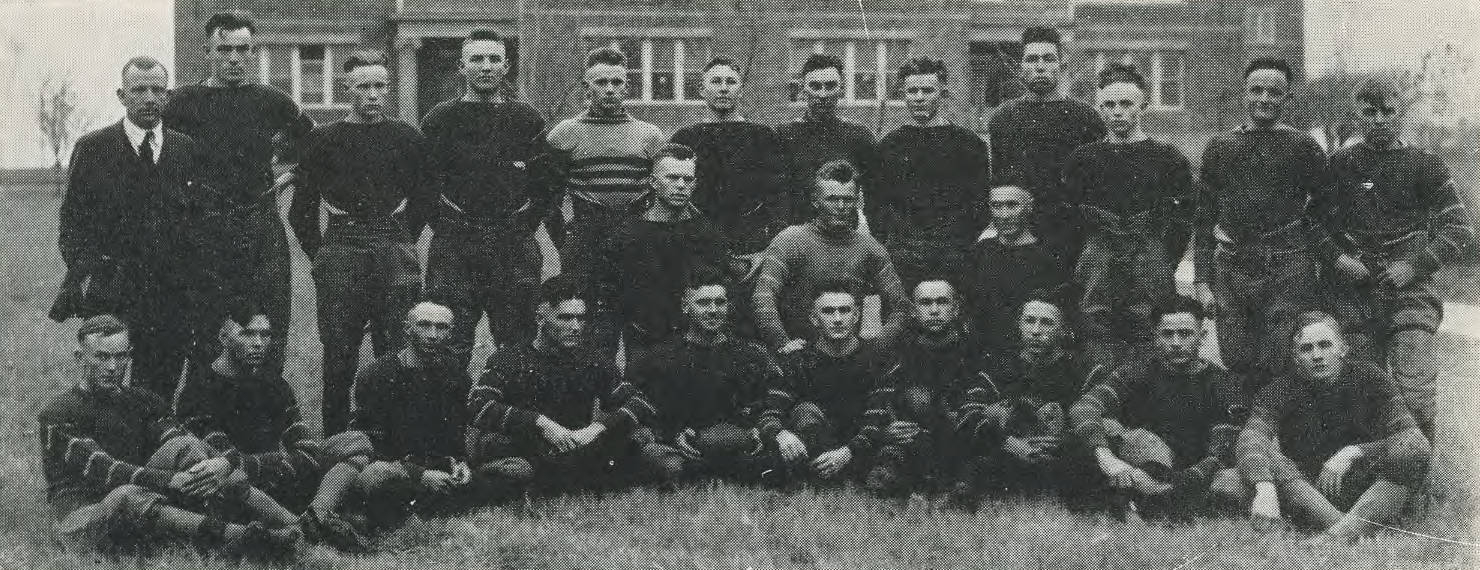
1919 football team

Founding East Texas Normal College president William Leonidas Mayo was initially hostile to football, objecting largely on the grounds that the sport was too violent and dangerous; he threatened that he would "kick the first football that is brought on this campus off, and the man who brings it". Nonetheless, the president's son, Marion Mayo, quietly organized a team that practiced off campus with the support of his mother.

The East Texas team played three games in its inaugural season in 1915, the highlight of which was a tie against a hapless Southern Methodist team that lost a game 147–0 to Rice that year. For the 1916 season, the school employed its first head coach, former Texas A&M player Johnny Garrity, and recruited De Loss Parsons and Frank Rubarth to play for the football team; the result was a winning season, with a record of 4–3. The football team also received President Mayo's formal approval during the 1916 season, and became officially accepted as an on-campus extracurricular activity.

The 1917 team, the first to represent the newly renamed East Texas State Normal College, played only two games; both were shutout losses to schools from Greenville, Texas, Burleson College and Wesley College, respectively. In 1918, the school did not play any games at all due to President Randolph B. Binnion's decision to suspend the football program during American participation in World War I. In 1919, the first year that the team competed as the "Lions", it returned to the gridiron with a winning record of 4–1–1.

=== TIAA and early LSC years (1920–1942) ===
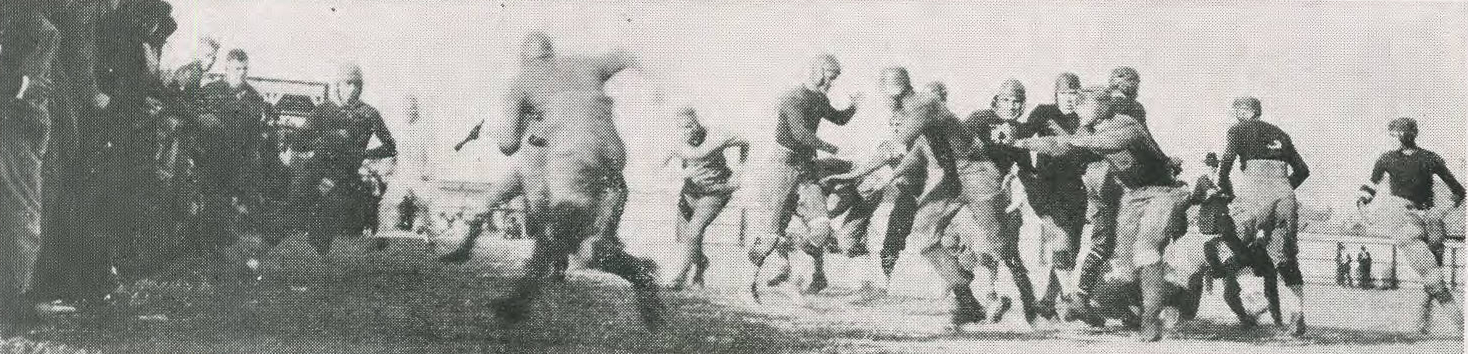
1922 football team in action

After competing largely without success in the Texas Intercollegiate Athletic Association (TIAA) in the 1920s, East Texas State and its football program became a charter member of the Lone Star Conference (LSC) in 1931. The team competed against conference opponents that included North Texas State, Southwest Texas State, Sam Houston State, and Stephen F. Austin under the direction of head coach John Wesley Rollins, who had played an instrumental role in organizing the LSC.

During the ten seasons between 1933 and 1942, the Lions football team dominated the LSC, winning the conference title outright five times, finishing as co-champions another year, ending three seasons as runners-up, and finishing third the other year during that span. East Texas State won three consecutive LSC titles from 1933 to 1935, the first of its 20 total conference titles. The 1934 team, which achieved a perfect record and only allowed six points all season, is generally regarded as one of the greatest in the school's history. In 1936, the year the team moved into a new stadium, halfback Johnny Garrison became the first East Texas State athlete in any sport to claim a national honor when he was named an honorable mention Little All-American selection. In 1937 and 1938, the Lions won back-to-back LSC championships. Also in 1938, fullback Darrell Tully was named to the Little All-American team while end Gene Hodge was given honorable mention. Before LSC football competition went on hiatus for three years during American participation in World War II, the Lions won another conference title in 1942.

=== Postwar years and the "Golden Fifties" (1946–1963) ===
During the 1940s and 1950s, university president James G. Gee displayed a particular affection for the school's football team, even to the point of "occasionally suggesting plays to the coaches"; he had previously been a part-time assistant coach at Sam Houston State as well as the University of Florida. In 1946, the football team finished the season with a 5–2–2 record under the direction of head coach Bob Berry, good enough for second place in the LSC, although it was mired in mediocrity until 1949. That year, which ended with an LSC championship, East Texas State moved its homecoming celebration from the spring, where it had been traditionally celebrated as "May Fete", to the fall so that it would coincide with a football game.

In 1951, new coach Milburn "Catfish" Smith began a sudden resurgence of the program that was aided by the outbreak of the Korean War and two related factors: the fact that the school was the only LSC member with an ROTC program and a rule that allowed junior college transfers who were enrolled in ROTC programs to play intercollegiate athletics for three additional years instead of the usual two. From 1951 to 1953, the team compiled an overall record of 30–2–1, and in both 1952 and 1953 won invitations to the Tangerine Bowl. In 1954, Jules V. Sikes took over as head coach following Smith's departure, and continued the successful ways of his predecessor; the Lions won (either outright or a share of) five straight conference championships from 1951 to 1955, and again in 1958 and 1959. During the "Golden Fifties", three Lions were named to the Little All-America first team (guard Bruno Ashley, quarterback Sam McCord, and end Norman Roberts), while numerous others received national second-team or honorable mention honors, or were named to all-LSC or all-Texas teams.

=== Hawkins years (1964–1985) ===
In 1964, Ernest Hawkins succeeded Sikes as head coach, and would be in charge of the program until his retirement in 1985; in their 22 years under Hawkins, the Lions won the LSC or finished as runners-up eight times. After the university integrated in 1964, African American athletes quickly became prominent players on East Texas State teams, with star running backs Curtis Guyton and "King" Arthur James leading the way in the mid to late 1960s. By the time he completed his college career in 1969, James had won National Association of Intercollegiate Athletics (NAIA) All-American honors twice and compiled 4,285 yards rushing, more than any other running back in the history of Texas college football to that point; he would later become the first Lion football player to have his number retired. The 1960s concluded with two more conference championships, one won outright in 1966 and the other shared with Texas A&I in 1969.

In 1972, the team won arguably its greatest achievement in its last season competing in the NAIA, when it captured the NAIA National Championship with a win over Carson–Newman College. The 1972 team, a two-loss LSC champion considered by some to be the greatest in the program's history, was led by star defensive end Harvey Martin, who would later win a Super Bowl with the Dallas Cowboys. Other Lions who would later play in the National Football League included Autry Beamon (Minnesota Vikings), Dee Mackey (Baltimore Colts), Alan Veingrad (Green Bay Packers and Dallas Cowboys), Dwight White (Pittsburgh Steelers), and Wade Wilson (Minnesota Vikings and Atlanta Falcons). In 1983, the Lions won their 20th LSC championship, which they shared with Southwest Texas State. In 1984, Veingrad was named Lone Star All-Conference, Lone Star Offensive Lineman of the Year and received Division II and national strength & conditioning All-American honors.

=== Vowell years (1986–1998) ===
Eddie Vowell took over as the team's head coach after Hawkins' retirement in 1985. Vowell's Lions won one LSC Championship in 1990 and finished second 4 times, posted 6 winning seasons and went to the NCAA Division II playoffs. three times, finishing in the national quarterfinal in 1990 and 1991 and in the first round in 1995. Vowell retired at the end of 1998 season.

=== Brister years (1999–2003) ===
In 1999, former Stephen F. Austin State University offensive coordinator Eddie Brister was hired to succeed Vowell. In Brister's final season, the Lions posted a 1–10 record, the worst in school history, and went winless in conference play for the first time in program history. Brister resigned at the end of the 2003 season.

=== Conley years (2004–2008) ===
Scotty Conley, an East Texas State alumnus, returned to Commerce to coach the Lions from 2004 to 2008. After another 5–5 season in 2008, Conley was dismissed by new A&M-Commerce athletic director Carlton Cooper. Conley compiled a record of 24–27.

=== Morriss years (2009–2012) ===
On January 7, 2009, Guy Morriss was offered the job to succeed Conley by athletic director Carlton Cooper and university president Daniel Jones.

Morriss's tenure at Texas A&M–Commerce began with five losses, before the Lions reeled off five straight wins, finishing 5–5 overall with a 5–0 record in their division, winning the North Division of the Lone Star Conference outright. That gave Texas A&M–Commerce its first division title since 2007 and its first outright title of any kind since 1990. Morriss also introduced the idea of wearing throwback jerseys that had the moniker "EAST TEXAS" on the front, as an homage to the schools previous name, East Texas State University.

After Morriss's first season, players from his football team coordinated an effort to illegally remove all copies of a student newspaper from campus because it contained an unfavorable article about a teammate who had been arrested on drug charges. Morriss said that he was "proud" of his players for taking the newspapers. He also referred to the theft as "the best team building exercise we have ever done." Morriss was subsequently disciplined by the school administration over the incident.

The 2010 season started with much excitement as a massive renovation to Memorial Stadium in Commerce was completed that added 3,500 seats to the east side of the stadium, a second press box, a new scoreboard with a video jumbotron, and new locker rooms. The Lions christened their newly renovated stadium by routing Upper Iowa, 33–10, giving Morriss six straight wins as head coach. However, the Lions only won two more games the rest of the season and finished with a disappointing 3–8 season. The 2011 season only produced one win, a 60–28 win over Eastern New Mexico, and the Lions finished 1–9. 2012 produced an identical record of 1–9, the lone victory coming over long time rival Texas A&M–Kingsville, 21–14 in overtime.

On November 12, 2012, after leading the A&M–Commerce football program for four seasons, Morriss stepped down as head football coach. He stayed on at A&M–Commerce as special assistant to the athletic director. His duties included fundraising, teaching, and oversight of athletic facilities and special projects.

=== Carthel years (2013–2018) ===
On January 22, 2013, after a nationwide search for a new coach, university president Dr. Daniel Jones and new athletic director Ryan Ivey hired former West Texas A&M defensive coordinator Colby Carthel. Carthel started his tenure with a 7–5 season that included wins over two ranked Division II teams, a win over Division I Houston Baptist, and an appearance in the Live United Texarkana Bowl, the first post season appearance since 1995 for the Lion program.

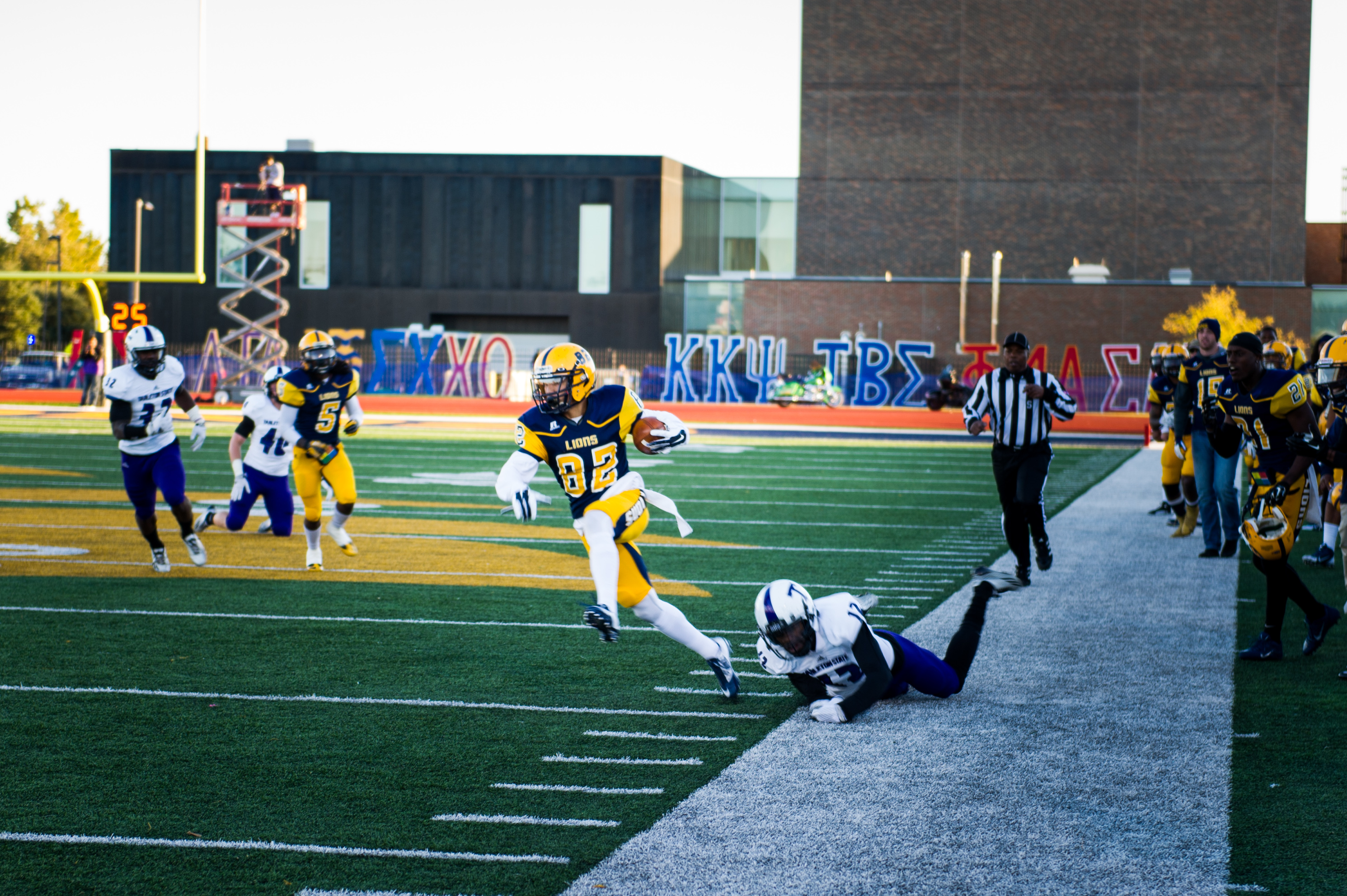
The 2014 team in action against the Tarleton State Texans

The next season, the Lions posted a 9–3 record winning the LSC Championship for the first time in 23 years, and winning 9 games, including a season-opening win over East Texas Baptist University by the score of 98–20. The Lions were once again invited to the postseason by routing former LSC foe East Central University 72–21 in the C.H.A.M.P.S. Heart of Texas Bowl.

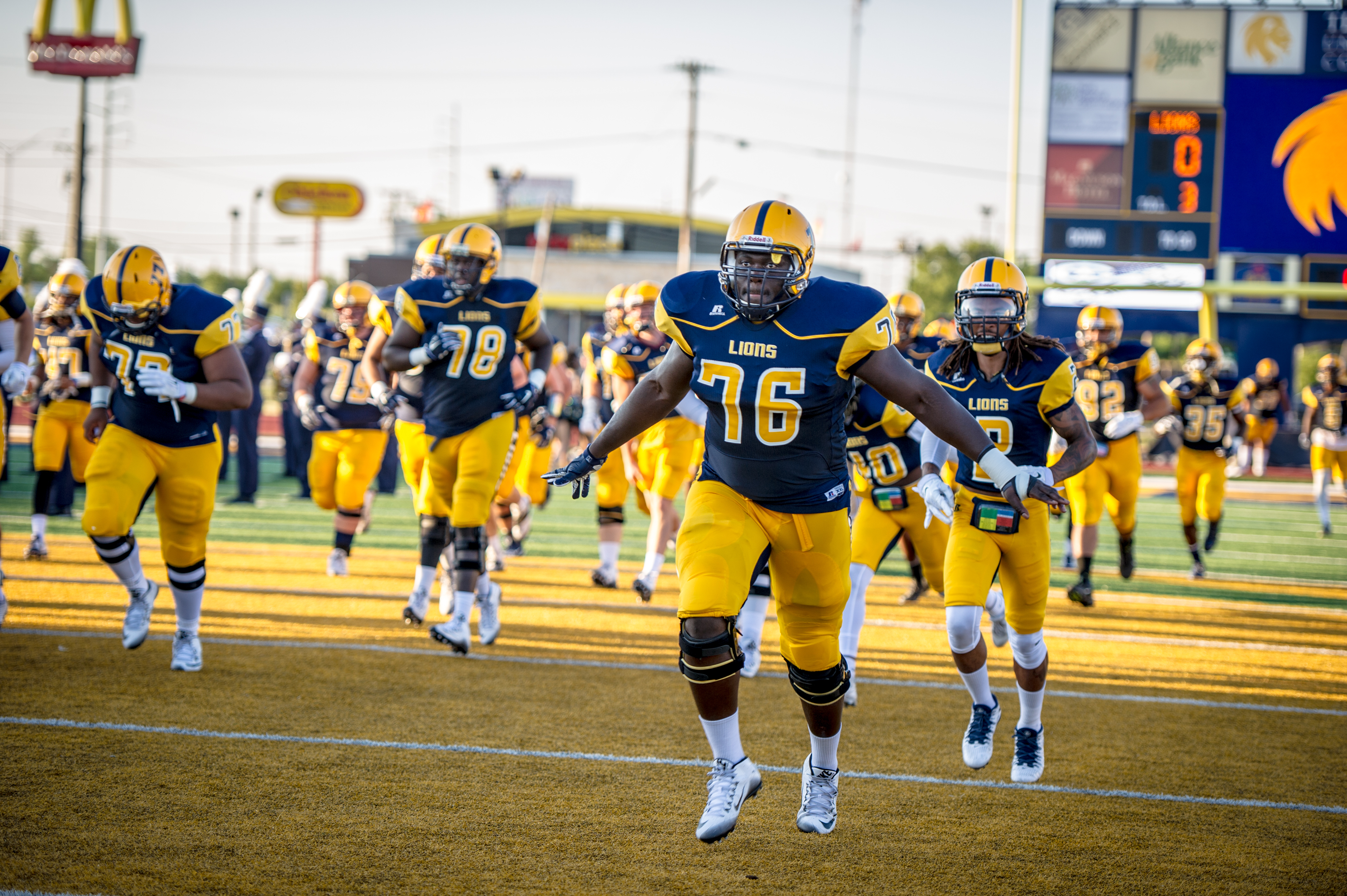
The 2015 team before playing the Adams State Grizzlies

The 2015 Lions repeated as conference champions and returned to the NCAA Division II playoffs for the first time in 20 years where they bowed out in the first round to the Ferris State Bulldogs.

In the 2016 season the Lions reached new heights under Carthel as they finished their regular season 9–1, with their lone loss coming by a single point, 26–25, at home against then-7th-ranked Midwestern State. Another trip to the postseason produced the program's first playoff win since 1991, over Colorado-Mesa, but the team would again bow out before the title game as they fell on the road to top-seeded Grand Valley State. The 2017 season would see another great performance for the Lions, as once again their lone loss was on the road against highly ranked Midwestern State.

This season, however, their postseason fortunes would improve as a road matchup against the top-seeded Central Washington Wildcats saw the Lions trailing 28–7 at halftime, but a ferocious comeback would produce a 34–31 double-overtime win and TAMC's first opportunity to advance past the second round of the playoffs in school history. In the quarterfinals, Carthel's squad would face off against another top team on the road in Minnesota State and pull off another surprising victory. This moved them into a quarterfinal matchup against a low-ranked program in Harding, who also knocked off the top seed in their division on their way through the bracket. A comfortable 31–17 victory gave the Lions their first-ever appearance in the NCAA Division II National Championship.

In December 2018, Carthel was named as the head coach of Stephen F. Austin State University.

=== Bailiff years (2019–2022) ===
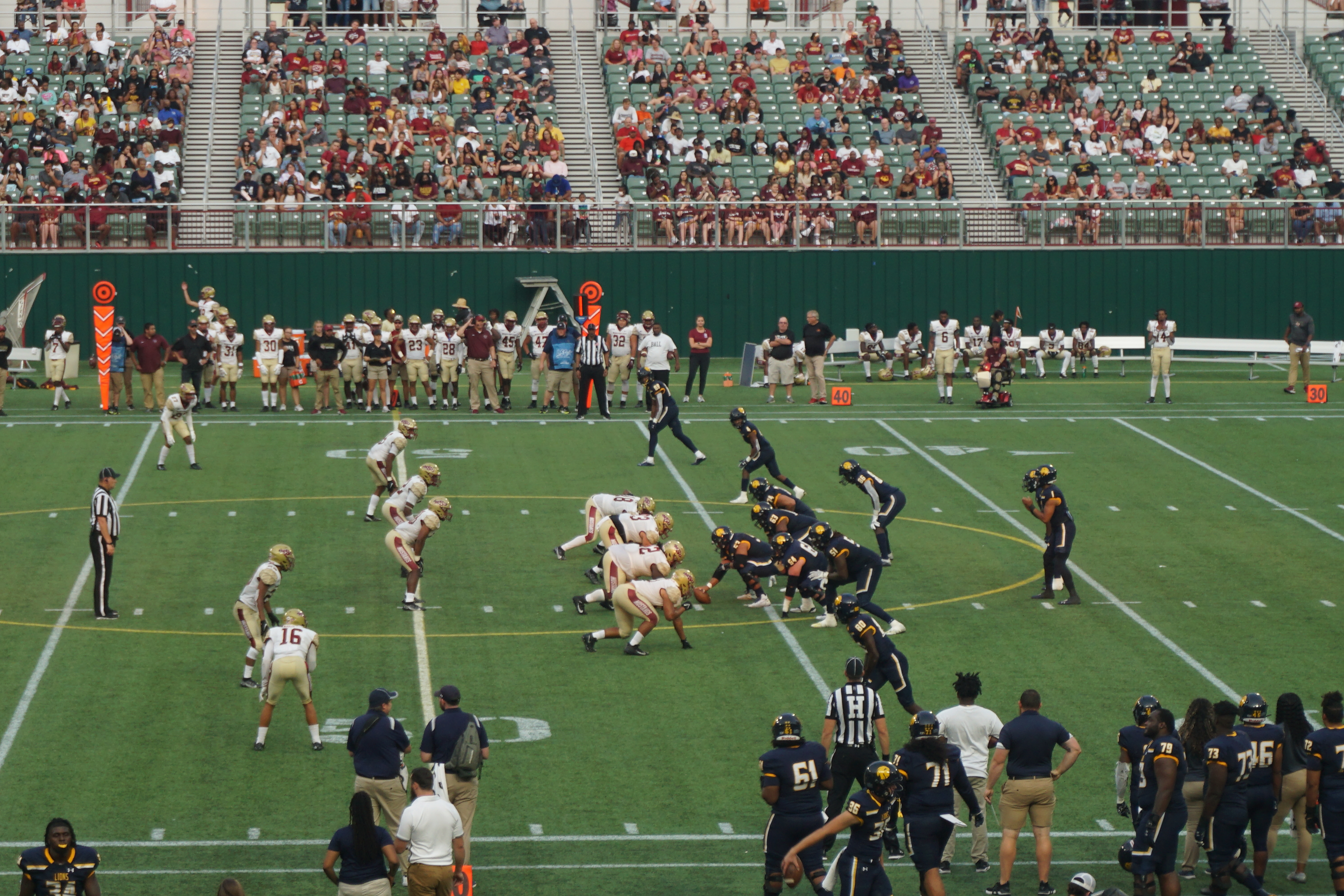
A&M–Commerce playing Midwestern State at Choctaw Stadium in 2021

On December 9, 2018, Texas A&M University-Commerce announced the hiring of former Rice University coach David Bailiff as the new head coach of the A&M-Commerce football team, becoming the 20th head coach in the history of the program. Bailiff is a former lineman and team captain for Texas State University and an honorable mention to the Lone Star Conference's 1970's All-Decade team, who touted his connection with the LSC upon his hiring, saying: "I'm an old Lone Star Conference guy, and that's where my roots are in college football. It's great and exciting what coach Carthel built here, and it's the first job I've had where you've got to look at the blueprint and continue building the momentum on something great he's already got started."

During his first season at the helm of A&M-Commerce, Bailiff's Lions would finish the season with a record of 11–3, while going 7–1 in Lone Star Conference play. A&M-Commerce was selected to the NCAA Division II Playoffs for the fifth consecutive year, reaching the third round after defeats of Tarleton State University and Colorado School of Mines before falling by a score of 42–21 to Minnesota State University, Mankato. Bailiff's first season was a promising one, with his 11 victories breaking the school record for wins in a Lion coach's first season.

What would have been Bailiff's second season at A&M-Commerce was put on hold due to the COVID-19 pandemic. The Lone Star Conference Council of Presidents postponed all competition in the sports of football, soccer, volleyball and basketball to the spring of 2021, and in August 2020, the A&M-Commerce Department of Athletics opted to play no outside competitions during the 2020–21 academic year. The fall semester consisted of practice and strength and conditioning normally consistent with "spring ball," while the spring semester consisted of the normal fall practice schedule. This decision, however, did allow for current students to retain a year of athletic eligibility.

The Lions played a full slate of games during the 2021 season, which included a neutral site contest against LSC foe Midwestern State University at Choctaw Stadium in Arlington, Texas. The 2021 season saw a regression in the on-field play of the Lions, with the team finishing with a 7–4 overall record and a 5–2 mark in Lone Star Conference competition. This also broke the streak of five consecutive playoff appearances for the team. The biggest highlight of the 2021 squad was its defense, which ended the season ranked fifth in NCAA Division II in defensive points allowed per game with a mark of 13.7 and third in total defense with 214.9 yards allowed per game.

Beginning with the 2022 season, the Lions moved up to NCAA Division I as a member of the Southland Conference, competing at the Football Championship Subdivision (FCS) level.

In their first game as a Division I school, the Lions defeated the Lincoln Oaklanders 52–7. Despite starting the season 5–2, including 3–0 in conference play, the Lions would lose their final four games, finishing their first Division I season at 5–6 overall and 3–3 in conference play.

After the season, the Lions and Bailiff couldn't agree to a contract extension, and his contract expired on December 31, 2022.

=== Dolezel years (since 2023) ===
On December 7, 2022, Texas A&M University-Commerce announced the hiring of former Frisco Fighters head coach Clint Dolezel as the 21st head coach of the A&M-Commerce football team.

In Dolezel's first season at the helm, the Lions endured their worst season since 2012, going 1–9 overall and 1–5 in conference play. Their only victory was a 41–10 win over the McNeese Cowboys. This marked the first time the Lions had back-to-back losing seasons since 2011–12.

Dolezel's second season saw the Lions go 3-9 overall and 2-4 in conference play, marking the Lions' third consecutive losing season. This was the first time since 2010-12 that the Lions endured three straight losing seasons.

In 2025, the Lion suffered their fourth consecutive losing season, going just 3-9 overall and 3-5 in conference play.

== Championships ==
=== National championships ===
Year	Association	Division	Head coach	Record	Opponent	Result
1972	NAIA (1)	Division I (1)	Ernest Hawkins	10–2 (7–1 LSC)	Carson–Newman	W, 21–18
2017	NCAA (1)	Division II (1)	Colby Carthel	14–1 (7–1 LSC)	West Florida	W, 37–27

== Postseason appearances ==
The Lions have an all-time postseason record of 18–8–2.

=== Bowl games ===
Season	Event	Opponent	Result
1952	Tangerine Bowl	Tennessee Tech	W 33–0
1953	Tangerine Bowl	Arkansas Tech	T 7–7
1957	Tangerine Bowl	Southern Miss	W 10–9
1958	Tangerine Bowl	Missouri Valley	W 26–7
2013	Live United Texarkana Bowl	Harding	L 3–44
2014	C.H.A.M.P.S. Heart of Texas Bowl	East Central	W 72–21

=== NAIA Division I playoffs ===
Season	Event	Opponent	Result
1972	NAIA National Semifinal; NAIA National Championship	Central Oklahoma; Carson-Newman	W 54–0; W 21–18
1974	Florida Central Classic Bowl	Bethune–Cookman	T 7–7
1980	NAIA National Quarterfinals; NAIA National Semi-Finals	Central Arkansas; Elon College	W 27–21; L 6–14

=== NCAA Division II playoffs ===
Season	Event	Opponent	Result
1990	NCAA Division II Playoffs First Round; NCAA Division II Playoffs Quarterfinals	Grand Valley State; Pittsburg State	W 20–14; L 28–60
1991	NCAA Division II Playoffs First Round; NCAA Division II Playoffs Quarterfinals	Grand Valley State; Pittsburg State	W 36–15; L 28–38
1995	NCAA Division II Playoffs First Round	Portland State	L 35–56
2015	NCAA Division II Playoffs First Round	Ferris State	L 30–48
2016	NCAA Division II Playoffs First Round; NCAA Division II Playoffs Second Round	Colorado Mesa; Grand Valley State	W 34–23; L 32–55
2017	NCAA Division II Playoffs First Round; NCAA Division II Playoffs Second Round; NCAA Division II Playoffs Quarterfinals; NCAA Division II Playoffs Semifinals; NCAA Division II Championship Game	Winona State; Central Washington; Minnesota State-Mankato; Harding; West Florida	W 20–6; W 34–31 ^{2OT} W 31–21; W 31–17; W 37–27
2018	NCAA Division II Playoffs First Round; NCAA Division II Playoffs Second Round	Minnesota Duluth; Tarleton State	W 33–17; L 28–34
2019	NCAA Division II Playoffs First Round; NCAA Division II Playoffs Second Round; NCAA Division II Playoffs Quarterfinals	Tarleton State; Colorado Mines; Minnesota State-Mankato	W 23–16; W 23–3; L 21–41

== Rivalries ==
=== The Chennault Cup ===
The Chennault Cup is a traveling trophy that is given to the winner of the annual Football game between East Texas A&M and the Texas A&M–Kingsville Javelinas. The trophy is named in honor of famous World War I and World War II pilot Claire Chennault, who was born in Commerce, but spent time training and teaching at the Naval Air Station Kingsville during his distinguished military career. Currently, East Texas A&M has the Chennault Cup after defeating the A&M-Kingsville Javelinas 35–10 during the 2021 season, marking the ninth-consecutive cup win for the Lions, the longest streak for either team. Texas A&M-Kingsville leads the series between the Lions and Javelinas with an overall record of 36–31–1, and 16–12 in the Chennault Cup series.

=== The President's Cup ===
The President's Cup is a traveling trophy that is awarded to the winner of the annual football game between East Texas A&M and the Tarleton State Texans. The Cup is sponsored by the Texas A&M University System and the presidents of the respective institutions as ETAMU and TSU are the two largest schools in the A&M System behind Texas A&M University, the flagship institution. Currently, East Texas A&M holds the lead in the series between these two schools with an overall record of 15–14 against Tarleton State. Tarleton currently holds the President's Cup after defeating then-A&M–Commerce by a score of 35–21 during the 2019 season.

=== East Texas vs. West Texas ===
Though not a trophy game, the annual match-up between the Lions and the Buffaloes of West Texas A&M University has developed into a fierce cross-state rivalry. The rivalry's name is derived from both schools' former names, East Texas State University (East Texas A&M) and West Texas State University (West Texas A&M) and their respective eastern and western location in the northern half of Texas. Adding to the competitive nature of the game during 2013 through 2018 is that then-A&M-Commerce head coach Colby Carthel was the defensive coordinator for the West Texas A&M Buffaloes from 2006–2012 and his father Don Carthel was the head coach of West Texas A&M's football team during that same time period. Currently, East Texas A&M leads the series 21–14 all-time against the West Texas A&M Buffaloes and has won seven matchups in a row following a 15–3 win during the 2021 season.

== Coaches ==
Updated as of May 20, 2026

#	Name	Term	GC	OW	OL	OT	O%	CW	CL	CT	C%	PW	PL	CCs	NCs
1	Johnnie Garrity	1916–1917	12	5	6	1	.458	0	0	0	–	0	0	0	0
2	Ernest M. Tipton	1919	6	4	1	1	.750	0	0	0	–	0	0	0	0
3	Cecil A. Cushman	1920	8	2	5	1	.313	0	0	0	–	0	0	0	0
4	Russell Jernigan	1921–1923	25	9	15	1	.380	0	0	0	–	0	0	0	0
5	Joe Murphy	1924–1928	42	8	31	3	.226	0	0	0	–	0	0	0	0
6	Will Hill Acker	1927–1930	16	2	13	1	.156	0	0	0	–	0	0	0	0
7	John W. Rollins	1931–1934	33	19	12	2	.606	12	2	1	.833	0	0	2	0
8	Bob Berry	1935–1941, 1946–1950	114	72	34	8	.667	32	17	3	.644	0	0	4	0
9	Dennis Vinzant	1942	8	4	3	1	.563	2	0	1	.833	0	0	1	0
10	Milburn Smith	1951–1953	33	30	2	1	.924	15	0	0	1.000	1	0	3	0
11	Jules V. Sikes	1954–1963	101	63	34	4	.644	44	20	2	.682	2	0	4	0
12	Ernest Hawkins	1964–1985	230	132	92	6	.587	90	64	4	.582	3	1	4	1
13	Eddie Vowell	1986–1998	146	72	73	1	.497	42	40	1	.512	2	3	1	0
14	Eddie Brister	1999–2003	54	19	35	0	.352	15	28	0	.349	0	0	0	0
15	Scotty Conley	2004–2008	51	24	27	0	.471	16	14	0	.533	0	1	0	0
16	Guy Morriss	2009–2012	41	10	31	0	.244	9	19	0	.321	0	0	0	0
17	Colby Carthel	2013–2018	77	59	18	0	.766	35	8	0	.814	8	4	3	1
18	David Bailiff	2019–2022	36	23	13	0	.639	15	6	0	.714	2	1	0	0
19	Clint Dolezel	2023–present	34	7	27	0	.206	7	14	0	.333	0	0	0	0

== Professional players ==
=== Current players ===
- Luis Perez–NFL Quarterback for the Los Angeles Rams, Philadelphia Eagles, and Detroit Lions / AAF Quarterback for the Birmingham Iron / XFL Quarterback for the Los Angeles Wildcats / UFL Quarterback for the Arlington Renegades
- Kader Kohou–cornerback for the Kansas City Chiefs
- Levi Drake Rodriguez–Defensive end for the Minnesota Vikings

=== Former NFL players ===
- Allen Roulette (Buffalo Bills)
- Autry Beamon (Minnesota Vikings)
- Cedric Bonner (Washington Redskins)
- Chad Brown (New Orleans Saints)
- Marv Brown (Detroit Lions)
- Curtis Buckley (Tampa Bay Buccaneers)
- Ricky Collins (Green Bay Packers)
- Tim Collier (San Francisco 49ers)
- Derrick Crawford (Cincinnati Bengals)
- Will Cureton (Cleveland Browns)
- Jon Gilliam (Kansas City Chiefs)
- Rich Houston (New York Giants)
- Vernon Johnson (Detroit Lions)
- Dee Mackey (Baltimore Colts)
- Kyle Mackey (New York Jets)
- Jared Machorro (Indianapolis Colts)
- Danny Mason (Denver Broncos)
- Kevin Mathis (Dallas Cowboys)
- Harvey Martin (Dallas Cowboys) Probowler, Super Bowl champion, Super Bowl MVP
- Wes Smith (Green Bay Packers)
- Charles Tuaau (Kansas City Chiefs)
- Aundra Thompson (Green Bay Packers)
- Darrell Tully (Detroit Lions)
- Alan Veingrad (Green Bay Packers and Dallas Cowboys) Super Bowl champion
- Sam Walton (New York Jets)
- Dwight White (Pittsburgh Steelers) Probowler, Super Bowl champion
- Antonio Wilson (Minnesota Vikings)
- Wade Wilson (Minnesota Vikings and Atlanta Falcons) Probowler, Super Bowl champion

=== Former professional players from other leagues ===
- Bobby Bounds (Canadian Football League and Arena Football League)
- Gary Compton (Arena Football League)
- Clint Dolezel (Arena Football League)
- Bo Kelly (Arena Football League)
- Bryn Roy (Canadian Football League)
- Michael Trigg (Arena Football League)
- Curtis Wester (Canadian Football League)

Marcus Gates ( Canadian Football League

== Stadium ==
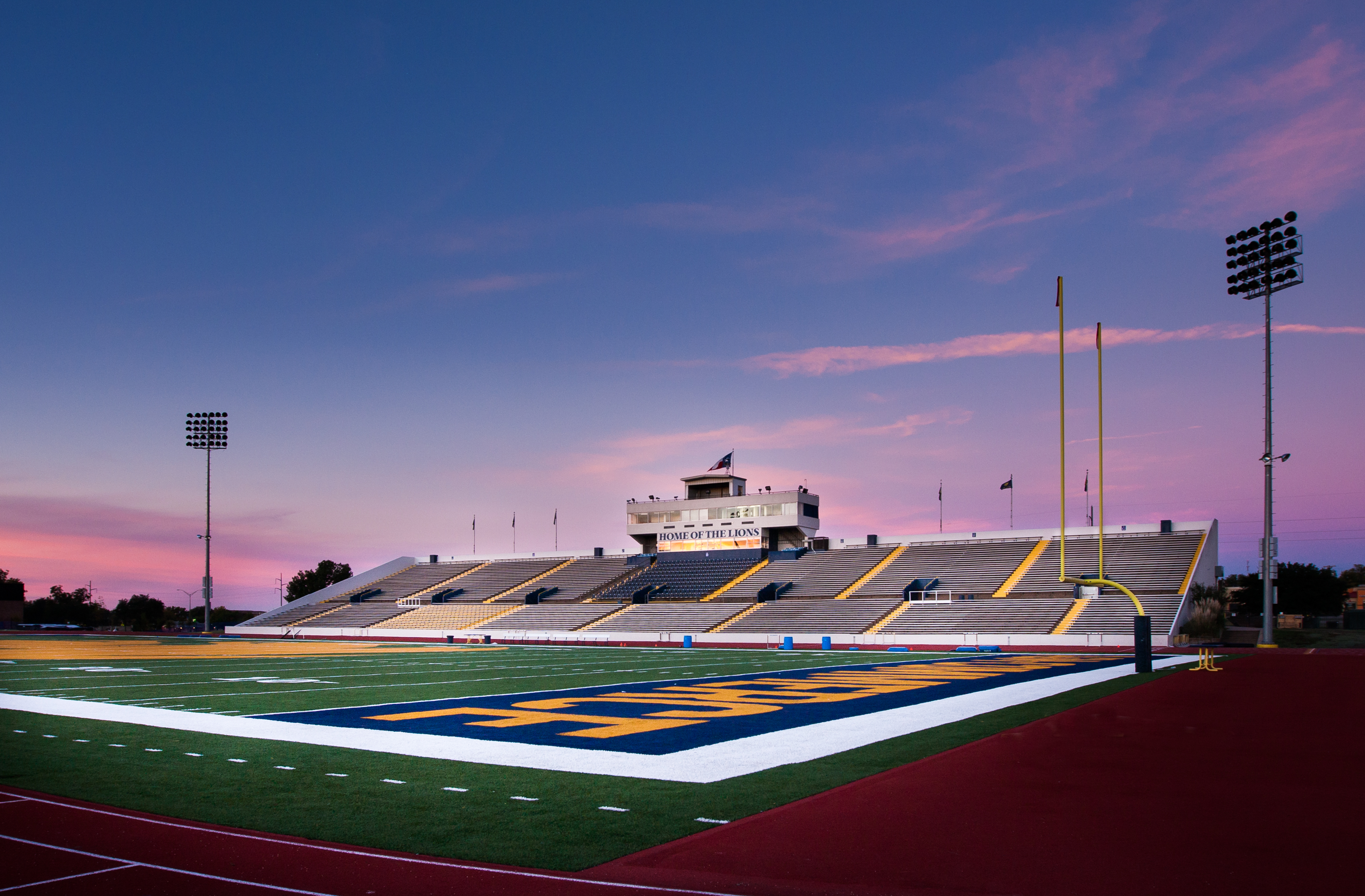
Memorial Stadium in November 2013

Ernest Hawkins Field at Memorial Stadium, originally named Memorial Stadium, has been home to the East Texas A&M football team since its opening in 1950. The Lions dedicated the stadium on September 23, 1950, during a game against then-rival North Texas State. The stadium cost $300,000 to build, part of which was raised by the school's Ex-Students Association after it had initiated the project in fall 1945; construction of the stadium began in fall 1949.

As originally built, Memorial Stadium capacity was 12,000; in 1980, the 2,000-capacity visiting stand on the east side of the field was torn down, reducing its capacity to 10,000. Other modifications and renovations made to the stadium since its construction have included the addition of five suites (including one for the university president) to the press box in 1973, a new ticket booth in 1987, a new scoreboard in 2006, new locker rooms in 2009, and a new east-side stand that (along with renovations to the main west-side stand) increased seating capacity to 13,500. In 2006, the stadium's natural grass surface was replaced with FieldTurf, which in summer 2013 was adorned with an oversized lion's head logo, measuring 50 yards (46 m) by 50 yards (46 m). In 2017, the field was named in honor of former head coach Ernest Hawkins. During the summer of 2019, the field surface was replaced with Symmetry SafeFlex and AstroTurf 3D3, while also removing the oversized Lion head logo with a smaller, more traditionally-sized logo.

== Future non-conference opponents ==
Announced non-conference opponents as of June 30, 2026.

2026	2027	2028
at Mercer^{1}	at Prairie View A&M	Prairie View A&M
at Tulsa	at Louisiana	at North Texas
Prairie View A&M		

1. FCS Kickoff

== See also ==
- List of NCAA Division I FCS football programs

== Notes ==
Reynolds, Donald E. (1993). Professor Mayo's College: A History of East Texas State University. Commerce, Texas: East Texas State University Press. ISBN 0963709208. Archived from the original on March 4, 2016.
