= 2007 NCAA Division II football rankings =

The 2007 NCAA Division II football rankings are from the American Football Coaches Association (AFCA). This is for the 2007 season.

== Legend ==
	Increase in ranking
	Decrease in ranking
	Not ranked previous week
(#–#)	Win–loss record
(Italics)	Number of first place votes
т	Tied with team above or below also with this symbol

== American Football Coaches Association poll ==
	Preseason	Week 1 Aug 29	Week 2 Sept 5	Week 3 Sept 12	Week 4 Sept 19	Week 5 Sept 26	Week 6 Oct 3	Week 7 Oct 10	Week 8 Oct 17	Week 9 Oct 24	Week 10 Oct 31	Week 11 Nov 7	Week 12 Nov 14	Week 13 Postseason	
1.	Grand Valley State (25)	Grand Valley State (0–0) (25)	Grand Valley State (1–0) (26)	Grand Valley State (1–0) (26)	Grand Valley State (2–0) (27)	Grand Valley State (3–0) (27)	Grand Valley State (4–0) (28)	Grand Valley State (5–0) (28)	Grand Valley State (6–0) (28)	Grand Valley State (7–0) (28)	Grand Valley State (8–0) (28)	Grand Valley State (9–0) (28)	Grand Valley State (10–0) (28)	Valdosta State (13–1) (28)	1.
2.	Northwest Missouri State (2)	Northwest Missouri State (0–0) (2)	Northwest Missouri State (0–0) (1)	North Dakota (2–0) (1)	North Dakota (3–0)	North Dakota (4–0)	North Dakota (5–0)	North Dakota (6–0)	North Alabama (6–0)	North Alabama (7–0)	Chadron State (9–0)	Chadron State (10–0)	Chadron State (11–0)	Northwest Missouri State (12–2)	2.
3.	North Dakota (1)	North Dakota (1–0) (1)	North Dakota (1–0) (1)	North Alabama (1–0) (1)	North Alabama (2–0) (1)	North Alabama (3–0) (1)	North Alabama (4–0)	North Alabama (5–0)	Chadron State (7–0)	Chadron State (8–0)	Nebraska–Omaha (8–0)	Nebraska–Omaha (9–0)	Nebraska–Omaha (10–0)	Grand Valley State (12–1)	3.
4.	North Alabama	North Alabama (0–0)	North Alabama (0–0)	Valdosta State (2–0)	Valdosta State (2–0)	Chadron State (4–0)	Chadron State (5–0)	Chadron State (6–0)	Nebraska–Omaha (6–0)	Nebraska–Omaha (7–0)	West Texas A&M (9–0)	West Texas A&M (10–0)	West Texas A&M (11–0)	California (PA) (13–1)	4.
5.	Chadron State	Chadron State (1–0)	Valdosta State (1–0)	Chadron State (3–0)	Chadron State (3–0)	Valdosta State (3–0)	Valdosta State (4–0)	Valdosta State (5–0)	Delta State (6–0)	West Texas A&M (8–0)	California (PA) (9–0)	Northwest Missouri State (8–1)	Northwest Missouri State (9–1)	Chadron State (12–1)	5.
6.	Valdosta State	Valdosta State (0–0)	Chadron State (2–0)	Pittsburg State (2–0)	Nebraska–Omaha (3–0)	Nebraska–Omaha (4–0)	Nebraska–Omaha (5–0)	Nebraska–Omaha (5–0)	West Texas A&M (7–0)	California (PA) (8–0)	Northwest Missouri State (7–1)	California (PA) (10–0)	California (PA) (11–0)	North Alabama (10–2)	6.
7.	Pittsburg State	Pittsburg State (1–0)	Pittsburg State (2–0)	Delta State (1–0)	Pittsburg State (3–0)	Carson–Newman (4–0)	Carson–Newman (5–0)	Carson–Newman (6–0)	Catawba (7–0)	Northwest Missouri State (6–1)	North Dakota (7–1)	North Dakota (8–1)	North Dakota (9–1)	Nebraska–Omaha (10–1)	7.
8.	Shepherd	South Dakota (0–0)	Delta State (1–0)	Nebraska–Omaha (2–0)	Carson–Newman (3–0)	Delta State (3–0)	Delta State (4–0)	Delta State (5–0)	California (PA) (7–0)	Tarleton State (8–0)	Valdosta State (7–1)	Valdosta State (8–1)	Valdosta State (9–1)	West Texas A&M (12–1)	8.
9.	Bloomsburg	Shepherd (1–0)	Carson–Newman (2–0)	Carson–Newman (2–0)	Delta State (2–0)	Newberry (4–0)	Northwest Missouri State (3–1)	Northwest Missouri State (4–1)	Northwest Missouri State (5–1)	North Dakota (6–1)	Delta State (7–1)	Delta State (8–1)	Delta State (9–1)	North Dakota (10–2)	9.
10.	South Dakota	Delta State (0–0)	Shepherd (2–0)	Shepherd (2–0)	Northwest Missouri State (1–1)	Northwest Missouri State (2–1)	West Texas A&M (5–0)	West Texas A&M (6–0)	Tarleton State (7–0)	Delta State (6–1)	North Alabama (7–1)	North Alabama (8–1)	North Alabama (9–1)	Delta State (10–2)	10.
11.	Abilene Christian	Abilene Christian (0–0)	Nebraska–Omaha (1–0)	Northwest Missouri State (0–1)	Newberry (3–0)	West Texas A&M (4–0)	California (PA) (5–0)	California (PA) (6–0)	North Dakota (6–1)	Valdosta State (6–1)	West Chester (8–1)	Carson–Newman (9–1)	Carson–Newman (10–1)	Central Washington (10–3)	11.
12.	Delta State	Bloomsburg (0–0)	Bloomsburg (1–0)	Newberry (2–0)	West Texas A&M (3–0)	California (PA) (4–0)	Midwestern State (5–0)	Catawba (6–0)	Abilene Christian (6–1)	West Chester (7–1)	Carson–Newman (8–1)	Catawba (9–1)	Catawba (10–1)	Catawba (11–2)	12.
13.	Nebraska–Omaha	Carson–Newman (1–0)	Northwood (1–0)	Northwood (2–0)	California (PA) (4–0)	Midwestern State (4–0)	Catawba (5–0)	Tarleton State (6–0)	Valdosta State (5–1)	Carson–Newman (7–1)	Catawba (8–1)	Tarleton State (9–1)	Tuskegee (10–0)	Shepherd (10–2)	13.
14.	Northwood	Nebraska–Omaha (0–0)	Newberry (1–0)	West Texas A&M (2–0)	Midwestern State (3–0)	Catawba (4–0)	Tarleton State (5–0)	Abilene Christian (5–1)	West Chester (6–1)	Tuskegee (7–0)	Tuskegee (8–0)	Tuskegee (9–0)	Shepherd (9–1)	Carson–Newman (10–1)	14.
15.	Carson–Newman	Northwood (0–0)	West Chester (1–0)	California (PA) (3–0)	Catawba (4–0)	Tarleton State (4–0)	Abilene Christian (4–1)	West Chester (5–1)	Carson–Newman (6–1)	Catawba (7–1)	Shepherd (8–1)	Shepherd (9–1)	Abilene Christian (9–2)	Abilene Christian (10–3)	15.
16.	Newberry	Newberry (0–0)	Southeastern Oklahoma State (1–0)	Midwestern State (2–0)	Tarleton State (3–0)	South Dakota (3–1)	Pittsburg State (4–1)	Midwestern State (5–1)	Tuskegee (6–0)	Shepherd (7–1)	Tarleton State (8–1)	Central Washington (8–1)	West Chester (9–2)	Tuskegee (12–0)	16.
17.	West Chester	West Chester (0–0)	West Texas A&M (1–0)	Tarleton State (3–0)	South Dakota (2–1)	Abilene Christian (3–1)	West Chester (4–1)	Tuskegee (5–0)	Shepherd (6–1)	Central Washington (6–1)	Central Washington (7–1)	Abilene Christian (8–2)	Mesa State (10–1)	West Chester (9–3)	17.
18.	Southeastern Oklahoma State	Southeastern Oklahoma State (0–0)	Midwestern State (1–0)	Catawba (3–0)	Abilene Christian (2–1)	Wingate (4–0)	IUP (4–0)	Shepherd (5–1)	Wingate (6–1)	Mesa State (8–0)	Pittsburg State (7–2)	IUP (8–1)	Newberry (9–2)	IUP (9–3)	18.
19.	Bemidji State	Midwestern State (1–0)	California (PA) (2–0)	South Dakota (1–1)	Wingate (4–0)	Pittsburg State (3–1)	Newberry (4–1)	Wingate (5–1)	Central Washington (5–1)	Pittsburg State (6–2)	Abilene Christian (7–2)	Midwestern State (8–2)	Winona State (10–1)	Mesa State (10–2)	19.
20.	Albany State	Bemidji State (0–0)	South Dakota (0–1)	Tiffin (3–0)	West Chester (2–1)	West Chester (3–1)	Tuskegee (4–0)	Virginia Union (6–0)	Mesa State (7–0)	IUP (6–1)	IUP (7–1)	West Chester (8–2)	Tarleton State (9–2)	Newberry (9–2)	20.
21.	Elizabeth City State	Albany State (1–0)	Catawba (2–0)	Abilene Christian (1–1)	Shepherd (2–1)	IUP (3–0)	Shepherd (4–1)	Mesa State (6–0)	Pittsburg State (5–2)	Abilene Christian (6–2)	Midwestern State (7–2)	Mesa State (9–1)	Central Washington (8–2)	Tarleton State (9–2)	21.
22.	California (PA)	Elizabeth City State (0–0)	Tarleton State (2–0)	Southern Connecticut State (2–0)	IUP (3–0) (Note: In the actual printed polls, IUP was listed as Indiana (PA))	Shepherd (3–1)	South Dakota (3–2)	Central Washington (4–1)	IUP (5–1)	Tiffin (7–1)	Mesa State (8–1)	Newberry (8–2)	Ashland (8–1)	Ashland (8–2)	22.
23.	Midwestern State	California (PA) (1–0)	Tiffin (2–0)	West Chester (1–1)	Northwood (2–1)	Mars Hill (4–0)	Wingate (4–1)	Pittsburg State (4–2)	Midwestern State (5–2)	Midwestern State (6–2)	Newberry (7–2)	Winona State (9–1)	IUP (8–2)	Winona State (10–2)	23.
24.	West Texas A&M	West Texas A&M (0–0)	Abilene Christian (0–1)	Wingate (3–0)	Mars Hill (3–0)	Missouri Western State (3–1)	Virginia Union (5–0)	IUP (4–1)	Tiffin (6–1)	Slippery Rock (7–1)	Winona State (8–1)	Virginia Union (9–1)	Midwestern State (8–3)	Washburn (8–4)	24.
25.	Washburn	Saginaw Valley State (0–0)	Southern Connecticut State (1–0)	Bloomsburg (1–1)	Tuskegee (2–0)	Tuskegee (3–0)	Mesa State (5–0)	Tiffin (5–1)	Albany State (6–1)	Newberry (6–2)	Virginia Union (8–1)	Hillsdale (8–2)	Washburn (8–3)	Midwestern State (8–3)	25.
	Preseason	Week 1 Aug 29	Week 2 Sept 5	Week 3 Sept 12	Week 4 Sept 19	Week 5 Sept 26	Week 6 Oct 3	Week 7 Oct 10	Week 8 Oct 17	Week 9 Oct 24	Week 10 Oct 31	Week 11 Nov 7	Week 12 Nov 14	Week 13 Postseason	
		Dropped: 25 Washburn	Dropped: 20 Bemidji State; 21 Albany State; 22 Elizabeth City State; 25 Saginaw Valley State	Dropped: 16 Southeastern Oklahoma State	Dropped: 20 Tiffin; 22 Southern Connecticut State; 25 Bloomsburg	Dropped: 23 Northwood	Dropped: 23 Mars Hill; 24 Missouri Western State	Dropped: 19 Newberry; 22 South Dakota	Dropped: 20 Virginia Union	Dropped: 18 Wingate; 25 Albany State	Dropped: 22 Tiffin; 24 Slippery Rock	Dropped: 18 Pittsburg State	Dropped: 24 Virginia Union; 25 Hillsdale	None	
