= Guy B. Gardner =

American football coach and college athletics administrator

- Gardner pictured in The Lasso 1955, Howard Payne yearbook

Biographical details
- Born: March 18, 1920; Idabel, Oklahoma, U.S.
- Died: December 11, 1980 (aged 60); Bonham, Texas, U.S.

Coaching career (HC unless noted)
- 1951–1952: Borger HS (TX)
- 1953–1955: Howard Payne

Administrative career (AD unless noted)
- 1953–1956: Howard Payne

Head coaching record
- Overall: 18–9–2 (college)

Accomplishments and honors

Championships
- 1 Texas Conference (1954)

Guy Burruss Gardner (March 18, 1920 – December 11, 1980) was an American football coach and college athletics administrator. He was the eighth head football coach at Howard Payne University in Brownwood, Texas, serving for three seasons, from 1953 to 1955, and compiling a record of 18–9–2. Gardner came to Howard Payne from Borger High School in Borger, Texas, where was head football coach in 1951 and 1952. He died after a long illness in 1980.

== Head coaching record ==
=== College ===
| Year | Team | Overall | Conference | Standing | Bowl/playoffs |
|---|---|---|---|---|---|
Howard Payne Yellow Jackets (Texas Conference) (1953–1955)
| 1953 | Howard Payne | 3–6 | 1–3 | 4th | |
| 1954 | Howard Payne | 9–1 | 2–0 | 1st | |
| 1955 | Howard Payne | 6–2–2 | 1–1 | 2nd | |
| Howard Payne: | | 18–9–2 | 4–4 | | |
| Total: | | 18–9–2 | | | |
National championship Conference title Conference division title or championship game berth
