= Elliott Field at Don Beebe Stadium =

Stadium in Chadron, Nebraska

- Interactive map of Elliott Field at Don Beebe Stadium
- Former names: Chadron Memorial Stadium (1929–1994)
- Location: E 12th Street, Chadron, Nebraska
- Coordinates: 42°49′6″N 103°0′1″W
- Owner: Chadron State College
- Capacity: 3,500
- Surface: natural grass

Construction
- Opened: 1995 (current rendition); 1929 (original stadium)

Tenants
- Chadron State Eagles football (NCAA) 1929–present

Elliott Field at Don Beebe Stadium is an American football stadium that plays host to the NCAA's Chadron State Eagles. Named after former Chadron State College president, Robert I. Elliott and Chadron alum and Super Bowl champion, Don Beebe. Started in the early 1900s as just a football field with removable bleachers surrounding, it was made a true stadium in 1929. A small grandstand with a small press box was erected. It held roughly 1,500 people although many more showed up for games. In 1995, a new grandstand and press box was constructed with 3,500 seats, which has housed the Eagles ever since.
