= 2007 NCAA Division II football season =

American college football season

- Regular season: August 30 – November 10, 2007
- Playoffs: November 17 – December 15, 2007
- National Championship: Braly Municipal Stadium; Florence, AL
- Champion: Valdosta State
- Harlon Hill Trophy: Danny Woodhead, Chadron State

The 2007 NCAA Division II football season, part of college football in the United States organized by the National Collegiate Athletic Association at the Division II level, began on August 30, 2007, and concluded with the NCAA Division II Football Championship on December 15, 2007 at Braly Municipal Stadium in Florence, Alabama, hosted by the University of North Alabama. The Valdosta State Blazers defeated the Northwest Missouri State Bearcats, 25–20, to win their second Division II national title.

2007 was the final season for one of the division's oldest conferences, the North Central Conference (NCC).

The Harlon Hill Trophy was awarded to Danny Woodhead, running back from Chadron State, for the second consecutive year.

== Conference and program changes ==
School	Former conference	New conference
Mary Marauders	Independent	NSIC
Mansfield Mountaineers	PSAC	Dropped program
North Carolina Central Eagles	CIAA	Independent (FCS)
Presbyterian Blue Hose	SAC	Independent (FCS)
Seton Hill Griffins	Independent (NAIA)	WVIAC
UNC Pembroke Braves	New program	Independent

Chowan and Mary completed their transitions to Division II and became eligible for the postseason.

== Conference standings ==
=== Northeast Region ===
2007 Northeast-10 Conference football standings
	Conf.			Overall
Team	W		L	W		L
Bryant $^	8	–	1	8	–	3
American International	7	–	2	7	–	3
Southern Connecticut ^	7	–	2	9	–	4
Bentley	6	–	3	7	–	3
Stonehill	5	–	4	5	–	5
C. W. Post	4	–	5	4	–	6
Merrimack	4	–	5	4	–	6
Assumption	3	–	6	4	–	7
Pace	1	–	8	1	–	10
Saint Anselm	0	–	9	0	–	10
+ – Conference co-champions; ^ – NCAA Division II playoff participant

2007 Pennsylvania State Athletic Conference football standings
	Conf.			Overall
Team	W		L	W		L
East
No. 17 West Chester x^	5	–	0	9	–	3
Bloomsburg	4	–	1	7	–	3
Kutztown	2	–	3	5	–	6
East Stroudsburg	2	–	3	3	–	6
Millersville	2	–	3	3	–	8
Cheyney	0	–	5	0	–	10
West
No. 4 California (PA) x^	6	–	0	13	–	1
No. 18 IUP ^	5	–	1	9	–	3
Slippery Rock	4	–	2	9	–	2
Edinboro	3	–	3	7	–	4
Shippensburg	2	–	4	3	–	8
Lock Haven	1	–	5	1	–	10
Clarion	0	–	6	0	–	11
x – Division champion/co-champions; ^ – NCAA Division II playoff participant; Rankings from AFCA poll

2007 West Virginia Intercollegiate Athletic Conference football standings
	Conf.			Overall
Team	W		L	W		L
No. 13 Shepherd $^	7	–	1	10	–	2
Charleston (WV)	6	–	2	8	–	3
West Liberty	6	–	2	8	–	3
West Virginia State	5	–	3	7	–	3
Glenville State	5	–	3	6	–	5
Fairmont State	3	–	5	6	–	5
Seton Hill #	3	–	5	3	–	7
West Virginia Wesleyan	1	–	7	3	–	8
Concord	0	–	8	1	–	10
$ – Conference champion; ^ – NCAA Division II playoff participant; # – Provisional Division II member; Rankings from AFCA Poll

=== Southeast Region ===
2007 Central Intercollegiate Athletic Association football standings
	Conf.			Overall
Team	W		L	W		L
Eastern Division
Virginia Union # xy	6	–	1	9	–	3
Elizabeth City State	5	–	2	5	–	5
Saint Paul's	4	–	3	5	–	5
Virginia State	3	–	4	4	–	6
Bowie State	3	–	4	3	–	7
Western Division
Shaw xy$^	6	–	1	8	–	4
Fayetteville State	4	–	3	4	–	6
Johnson C. Smith	2	–	5	3	–	7
St. Augustine's †	2	–	5	2	–	8
Livingstone	0	–	7	0	–	10
Championship: Shaw 31, Virginia Union 24 ^{2OT}
$ – Conference champion; x – Division champion/co-champions; y – Championship game participant; ^ – NCAA Division II playoff participant; # – Pioneer Bowl participant † – St. Augustine's vacated both wins

2007 Gulf South Conference football standings
	Conf.			Overall
Team	W		L	W		L
No. 10 Delta State $^	8	–	0	10	–	2
No. 1 Valdosta State ^	7	–	1	13	–	1
No. 6 North Alabama ^	7	–	1	10	–	2
Henderson State	6	–	2	7	–	3
Harding	5	–	3	6	–	4
Arkansas Tech	3	–	5	5	–	5
Arkansas–Monticello	3	–	5	4	–	7
Ouachita Baptist	2	–	6	4	–	6
Southern Arkansas	2	–	6	3	–	7
West Georgia	1	–	7	2	–	9
West Alabama	0	–	8	1	–	9
$ – Conference champion; ^ – NCAA Division II playoff participant; Rankings from AFCA poll

2007 South Atlantic Conference football standings
	Conf.			Overall
Team	W		L	W		L
No. 14 Carson–Newman +	5	–	1	10	–	1
No. 12 Catawba +^	5	–	1	11	–	2
Newberry	4	–	2	9	–	2
Tusculum	4	–	2	6	–	5
Wingate	2	–	4	7	–	4
Mars Hill	1	–	5	5	–	5
Lenoir–Rhyne	0	–	6	2	–	9
+ – Conference co-champions; ^ – NCAA Division II playoff participant; Rankings from AFCA poll

2007 Southern Intercollegiate Athletic Conference football standings
	Conf.			Overall
Team	W		L	W		L
No. 16 Tuskegee # $	7	–	0	12	–	0
Albany State ^	6	–	1	8	–	3
Fort Valley State	5	–	2	8	–	3
Morehouse	4	–	3	7	–	3
Lane	4	–	3	7	–	3
Stillman	3	–	4	7	–	4
Kentucky State	3	–	4	3	–	8
Clark Atlanta	2	–	5	3	–	8
Benedict	1	–	6	2	–	9
Miles	0	–	7	2	–	9
$ – Conference champion; ^ – NCAA Division II playoff participant; # – Pioneer Bowl participant; Rankings from AFCA poll

2007 NCAA Division II Southeast Region independents football records
	Conf.			Overall
Team	W		L	W		L
North Greenville		–		5	–	6
UNC Pembroke		–		4	–	7
Brevard #		–		2	–	9
Chowan		–		2	–	9
# – Provisional NCAA Division II member

=== Northwest Region ===
2007 Great Lakes Intercollegiate Athletic Conference football standings
	Conf.			Overall
Team	W		L	W		L
No. 4 Grand Valley State $^	9	–	0	12	–	1
No. 22 Ashland ^	8	–	1	8	–	2
Hillsdale	7	–	3	8	–	3
Saginaw Valley State *	7	–	3	7	–	3
Michigan Tech	6	–	4	6	–	5
Ferris State	5	–	5	6	–	5
Indianapolis	5	–	5	6	–	5
Northwood	5	–	5	5	–	5
Northern Michigan	4	–	6	4	–	6
Findlay	3	–	7	4	–	7
Mercyhurst	3	–	7	4	–	7
Wayne State (MI)	2	–	8	3	–	8
Gannon	0	–	10	0	–	11
$ – Conference champion; ^ – NCAA Division II playoff participant; * – Saginaw Valley State forfeited wins against Gannon, Ferris State, Northern Michigan, and Findlay.; Rankings from AFCA poll

2007 North Central Conference football standings
	Conf.			Overall
Team	W		L	W		L
No. 7 Nebraska–Omaha $^	8	–	0	10	–	1
No. 9 North Dakota ^	7	–	1	10	–	2
No. 11 Central Washington ^	6	–	2	10	–	3
South Dakota	5	–	3	6	–	5
Minnesota State	3	–	5	5	–	6
Minnesota–Duluth	3	–	5	4	–	6
Augustana (SD)	2	–	6	4	–	7
St. Cloud State	1	–	7	4	–	7
Western Washington	1	–	7	2	–	8
$ – Conference champion; ^ – NCAA Division II playoff participant; Rankings from AFCA Poll

2007 Northern Sun Intercollegiate Conference football standings
	Conf.			Overall
Team	W		L	W		L
No. 23 Winona State $^	9	–	0	10	–	2
Wayne State (NE) #	7	–	2	7	–	5
Mary	7	–	2	7	–	4
Bemidji State	6	–	3	7	–	4
Northern State	5	–	4	5	–	6
Concordia–St. Paul	3	–	6	4	–	7
Minnesota State–Moorhead	3	–	6	4	–	7
Upper Iowa	2	–	7	3	–	8
SW Minnesota State	2	–	7	2	–	9
Minnesota–Crookston	1	–	8	2	–	8
$ – Conference champion; ^ – NCAA Division II playoff participant; # – Mineral Water Bowl participant; Rankings from AFCA poll

2007 Great Lakes Football Conference standings
	Conf.			Overall
Team	W		L	W		L
Tiffin $	5	–	0	9	–	2
Central State (OH) #	3	–	2	5	–	5
Missouri–Rolla	3	–	2	4	–	7
Saint Joseph's (IN)	3	–	2	4	–	7
Kentucky Wesleyan	1	–	4	3	–	8
Lincoln (MO)	0	–	5	2	–	8
$ – Conference champion; # – Provisional NCAA Division II member

2007 NCAA Division II Northwest Region independents football records
	Conf.			Overall
Team	W		L	W		L
Western Oregon #		–		9	–	2
Dixie State @		–		3	–	8
Humboldt State		–		2	–	8
@ – Provisional NCAA Division II member # – Dixie Rotary Bowl participant

=== Southwest Region ===
2007 Lone Star Conference football standings
	Conf.			Overall
Team	W		L	W		L
Overall*
No. 8 W. Texas A&M $^	9	–	0	12	–	1
No. 15 Abilene Christian ^†	8	–	1	10	–	3
No. 21 Tarleton State	7	–	2	9	–	2
No. 25 Midwestern State	6	–	3	8	–	3
Texas A&M–Commerce	5	–	4	5	–	6
SW Oklahoma State	4	–	5	6	–	5
Central Oklahoma	4	–	5	4	–	6
Eastern New Mexico	3	–	6	5	–	6
SE Oklahoma State	3	–	6	4	–	6
Northeastern State	3	–	6	3	–	7
Texas A&M–Kingsville	3	–	6	3	–	8
Angelo State	2	–	7	2	–	8
East Central	2	–	7	2	–	9
North Division
SW Oklahoma State x	3	–	2	6	–	5
Texas A&M–Commerce x	3	–	2	5	–	6
SE Oklahoma State x	3	–	2	4	–	6
Central Oklahoma x	3	–	2	4	–	6
Northeastern State x	3	–	2	3	–	7
East Central	0	–	5	2	–	9
South Division
No. 8 W. Texas A&M $^	6	–	0	12	–	1
No. 15 Abilene Christian ^†	5	–	1	10	–	3
No. 21 Tarleton State	4	–	2	9	–	2
No. 25 Midwestern State	3	–	3	8	–	3
Texas A&M–Kingsville	2	–	4	3	–	8
Angelo State	1	–	5	2	–	8
Eastern New Mexico	0	–	6	5	–	6
$ – Conference champion; ^ – NCAA Division II playoff participant; * – The LSC counted separate overall and division standings. † – Abilene Christian vacated all ten wins.; Rankings from AFCA Poll

2007 Mid-America Intercollegiate Athletics Association football standings
	Conf.			Overall
Team	W		L	W		L
No. 2 NW Missouri State $^	9	–	0	12	–	2
No. 24 Washburn ^	7	–	2	8	–	4
Missouri Western #	6	–	3	9	–	3
Pittsburg State	6	–	3	8	–	3
Central Missouri	6	–	3	7	–	4
Missouri Southern	4	–	5	6	–	5
Truman	4	–	5	6	–	5
Fort Hays State	2	–	7	4	–	7
Emporia State	1	–	8	3	–	8
Southwest Baptist	0	–	9	0	–	11
$ – Conference champion; ^ – NCAA Division II playoff participant; # – Mineral Water Bowl participant; Rankings from AFCA poll

2007 Rocky Mountain Athletic Conference football standings
	Conf.			Overall
Team	W		L	W		L
No. 5 Chadron State $^	8	–	0	12	–	1
No. 19 Mesa State ^	7	–	1	10	–	2
Colorado Mines #	6	–	2	7	–	5
Nebraska–Kearney	5	–	3	6	–	4
Western New Mexico	4	–	4	4	–	6
New Mexico Highlands	3	–	5	4	–	6
Adams State	2	–	6	2	–	9
Fort Lewis	1	–	7	1	–	9
Western State (CO)	0	–	8	1	–	10
$ – Conference champion; ^ – NCAA Division II playoff participant; # – Dixie Rotary Bowl participant; Rankings from AFCA poll

2007 NCAA Division II Southwest Region independents football records
	Conf.			Overall
Team	W		L	W		L
OK Panhandle State		–		0	–	10

== Conference summaries ==
Conference Champions

Central Intercollegiate Athletic Association – Shaw
Great Lakes Football Conference – Tiffin
Great Lakes Intercollegiate Athletic Conference – Grand Valley State
Gulf South Conference – Delta State
Lone Star Conference – West Texas A&M
Mid-America Intercollegiate Athletics Association – Northwest Missouri State
North Central Conference – Nebraska–Omaha
Northeast-10 Conference – Bryant
Northern Sun Intercollegiate Conference – Winona State
Pennsylvania State Athletic Conference – West Chester (East), California (PA) (West)
Rocky Mountain Athletic Conference – Chadron State
South Atlantic Conference – Carson-Newman and Catawba
Southern Intercollegiate Athletic Conference – Tuskegee
West Virginia Intercollegiate Athletic Conference – Shepherd

== Postseason ==
2007 NCAA Division II Football Championship
- Teams: 24
- Finals Site: Braly Municipal Stadium; Florence, Alabama
- Champion: Valdosta St.; (2nd title, title game)
- Runner-up: NW Missouri St.; (5th title game)
- Semifinalists: California (PA); Grand Valley St.
- Winning coach: championship

The 2007 NCAA Division II National Football Championship playoffs involved 24 schools playing in a single-elimination tournament to determine the national champion of men's NCAA Division II college football.

The tournament began on November 17, 2008 and concluded on December 15, 2008 with the 2007 NCAA Division II National Football Championship game at Braly Municipal Stadium near the campus of the University of North Alabama in Florence, Alabama.

In the championship game the Valdosta State University Blazers defeated the Northwest Missouri State University Bearcats, 25–21, to win their second national championship.

=== Participants ===
School	Conference	Season record
Abilene Christian University	Lone Star Conference	9–2
Albany State University	Southern Intercollegiate Athletic Conference	8–2
Ashland University	Great Lakes Intercollegiate Athletic Conference	8–1
Bryant University	Northeast Ten Conference	8–2
California University of Pennsylvania	Pennsylvania State Athletic Conference	11–0
Catawba College	South Atlantic Conference	10–1
Central Washington University	North Central Conference	8–2
Chadron State College	Rocky Mountain Athletic Conference	11–0
Delta State University	Gulf South Conference	9–1
Grand Valley State University	Great Lakes Intercollegiate Athletic Conference	10–0
Indiana University of Pennsylvania	Pennsylvania State Athletic Conference	8–2
Mesa State College	Rocky Mountain Athletic Conference	10–1
University of Nebraska at Omaha	North Central Conference	10–0
University of North Alabama	Gulf South Conference	9–1
University of North Dakota	North Central Conference	9–1
Northwest Missouri State University	Mid-America Intercollegiate Athletics Association	9–1
Shaw University	Central Intercollegiate Athletic Association	8–3
Shepherd University	West Virginia Intercollegiate Athletic Conference	9–1
Southern Connecticut State University	Northeast Ten Conference	8–3
Valdosta State University	Gulf South Conference	9–1
Washburn University	Mid-America Intercollegiate Athletics Association	8–3
West Chester University	Pennsylvania State Athletic Conference	9–2
West Texas A&M University	Lone Star Conference	11–0
Winona State University	Northern Sun Intercollegiate Conference	10–1

=== Bids by conference ===
Conference	Total	Schools	Super Region
Central Intercollegiate Athletic Association	1	Shaw University	3
Great Lakes Intercollegiate Athletic Conference	2	Ashland University; Grand Valley State University	1
Gulf South Conference	3	Delta State University; University of North Alabama; Valdosta State University	3
Lone Star Conference	2	Abilene Christian University; West Texas A&M University	2
Mid-America Intercollegiate Athletics Association	2	Northwest Missouri State University; Washburn University	2
North Central Conference	3	Central Washington University; University of Nebraska at Omaha; University of North Dakota	1
Northeast Ten Conference	2	Southern Connecticut State University; Bryant University	4
Northern Sun Intercollegiate Conference	1	Winona State University	1
Pennsylvania State Athletic Conference	3	California University of Pennsylvania; Indiana University of Pennsylvania; West Chester University	4
Rocky Mountain Athletic Conference	2	Chadron State College; Mesa State College	2
South Atlantic Conference	1	Catawba College	3
Southern Intercollegiate Athletic Conference	1	Albany State University	3
West Virginia Intercollegiate Athletic Conference	1	Shepherd University	4

=== Playoff format ===
The first-round games were conducted on the campus of one of the competing institutions as determined by the NCAA Division II Football Committee. Two teams in each super regional earned first-round byes. The first-round winners advanced to face a bye team in their super regional. Second-round winners met in the quarterfinals and quarterfinal winners advanced to play in the semifinals.

First-round, second-round, quarterfinal and semifinal games were played on the campus of one of the competing institutions as determined by the NCAA Division II Football Committee. The home team at the championship was determined by the Division II Football Committee and the Shoals National Championship Committee.

=== National television coverage ===
The championship game was played at Braly Municipal Stadium in Florence, Alabama and broadcast live on ESPN2 on December 15.

=== Final standings ===
Place	School
1st	Valdosta State University
2nd	Northwest Missouri State University
3rd	California University of Pennsylvania
3rd	Grand Valley State University
5th	Chadron State College
5th	Central Washington University
5th	University of North Alabama
5th	Shepherd University
9th	Abilene Christian University
9th	Catawba College
9th	Delta State University
9th	Indiana University of Pennsylvania
9th	University of Nebraska at Omaha
9th	University of North Dakota
9th	Southern Connecticut State University
9th	West Texas A&M University
17th	Albany State University
17th	Ashland University
17th	Bryant University
17th	Mesa State College
17th	Shaw University
17th	Washburn University
17th	West Chester University
17th	Winona State University

=== Bracket and standings ===
==== Super Regional 1 ====
First round November 17
6	Winona State	2
3	North Dakota	44
5	Ashland	24
4	Central Washington	40

Second round November 24
2	Grand Valley State	21
3	North Dakota	14
1	Nebraska–Omaha	17
4	Central Washington	20

Super Regional finals December 1
4	Central Washington	21
2	Grand Valley State	41

==== Super Regional 3 ====
First round November 17
6	Washburn	39
3	West Texas A&M	40
5	Mesa State	12
4	Abilene Christian	56

Second round November 24
2	Northwest Missouri State	56
3	West Texas A&M	28
1	Chadron State (3OT)	76
4	Abilene Christian	73

Super Regional finals December 1
2	Northwest Missouri State	26
1	Chadron State	13

==== Super Regional 2 ====
First round November 17
6	Shaw	7
3	Delta State	45
5	Albany State	35
4	Catawba	66

Second round November 24
2	North Alabama	20
3	Delta State	17
1	Valdosta State	55
4	Catawba	29

Super Regional finals December 1
2	North Alabama	27
1	Valdosta State	37

==== Super Regional 4 ====
First round November 17
6	IUP	45
3	West Chester	35
5	Bryant	28
4	S. Connecticut	45

Second round November 24
2	Shepherd	41
6	Indiana (PA)	34
1	California (PA)	43
4	S. Connecticut	7

Super Regional finals December 1
2	Shepherd	38
1	California (PA)	58

==== Semifinals and championship ====
Semifinals; December 8
SR1 Champion	Grand Valley State	16
SR2 Champion	Northwest Missouri State	34
SR3 Champion	Valdosta State	28
SR4 Champion	California (PA)	24

Final; December 15
SR2 Champion	Northwest Missouri State	21
SR3 Champion	Valdosta State	25

== See also ==
- 2007 NCAA Division I FBS football season
- 2007 NCAA Division I FCS football season
- 2007 NCAA Division III football season
- 2007 NAIA football season
