= List of Central Arkansas Bears basketball head coaches =

The following is a list of Central Arkansas Bears basketball head coaches. There have been 20 head coaches of the Bears in their 101-season history.

Central Arkansas' current head coach is Anthony Boone. He was named as the Bears' permanent head coach in March of 2020, after having served as interim head coach since December 2019. Boone replaced Russ Pennell, who took a leave of absence in December 2019 and left for good three weeks later.

No.	Tenure	Coach	Years	Record	Pct.
1	1920–1929	Dan Estes	9	99–64	.607
2	1929–1934	Orion Wray	5	54–35	.607
3	1934–1935	Jerry Dalrymple	1	25–6–1	.797
4	1935–1941	Warren B. Woodson	6	114–40	.740
5	1941–1942	Loyd Roberts	1	25–3	.893
6	1944–1945 (Note: Eldson coached for the first four games of the 1944–45 season, and Hindsman finished the season. The exact dates of the games for this season are unknown; both coaches are listed as having coached from 1944 to 1945.)	Harold Eldson	1	0–4	.000
7	1944–1945; 1946–1947	Sam Hindsman	2	29–13	.690
8	1945–1946	Charles McGibbony	1	16–10	.615
9	1947–1948	Glen Smith	1	21–2	.913
10	1948–1949	Howard Montgomery	1	14–11	.560
11	1949–1958	Cecil Garrison	9	154–81	.655
12	1958–1969; 1970–1973	Cliff Horton	12	229–142	.617
–	1969–1970*	Marvin Bishop	1	13–14	.481
13	1973–1979	Don Nixon	6	95–76	.556
14	1979–1993	Don Dyer	14	285–145	.663
15	1993–1999 (Note: Hervey took over from Jones with eight games remaining in the season.)	Arch Jones	6	77–74	.510
16	1999–2003 (Note: Hervey was reassigned in January 2003. James was named interim coach until the end of the season.)	Charles Hervey	5	62–39	.614
–	2003*	David James	1	4–7	.364
17	2003–2010	Rand Chappell	7	104–104	.500
18	2010–2013 (Note: Williamson resigned to take an assistant coaching position with the Sacramento Kings just before the 2013–14 season. Finley was named interim head coach for the season.)	Corliss Williamson	3	26–62	.295
–	2013–2014*	Clarence Finley	1	8–21	.276
19	2014–2019 (Note: Pennell took a leave of absence in December 2019, and stepped down as head coach in January 2020.)	Russ Pennell	1	50–116	.301
20	2019–present (Note: Finley was named interim head coach when Pennell took a leave of absence, and was hired as permanent head coach in March 2020.)	Anthony Boone	4	34–74	.315
Totals		20 coaches	101 seasons	1,538–1,143–1	.574
Records updated through end of 2022–23 season * - Denotes interim head coach. Source
