= Raymond Monica =

American football player and coach

Current position
- Title: Head coach
- Team: Clarion
- Conference: PSAC
- Record: 14–30

Biographical details
- Education: North Alabama (1990)

Playing career
- 1987: Northeast Mississippi
- Position: Quarterback

Coaching career (HC unless noted)
- 1988: Northeast Mississippi (SA)
- 1989: North Alabama (SA/RB)
- 1992–1997: North Alabama (DL/RC)
- 1998–2005: Temple (DC)
- 2006–2012: Kutztown
- 2013–2018: Arkansas Tech
- 2019–2020: Southeastern Louisiana (DL)
- 2021: Southeastern Louisiana (DC/LB)
- 2022–present: Clarion

Head coaching record
- Overall: 93–98
- Tournaments: 1–2 (NCAA D-II playoffs)

Accomplishments and honors

Championships
- PSAC East Division (2011)

Raymond Monica is an American college football coach and former player. He is the head football coach for PennWest Clarion, a position he has held since 2022. Monica served as the head football coach at Kutztown University of Pennsylvania from 2006 to 2012 and Arkansas Tech University from 2013 to 2018.

== Head coaching record ==
Year	Team	Overall	Conference	Standing	Bowl/playoffs	AFCA^{#}
Kutztown Golden Bears (Pennsylvania State Athletic Conference) (2006–2012)
2006	Kutztown	4–6	2–4	5th (East)		
2007	Kutztown	5–6	2–3	T–3rd (East)		
2008	Kutztown	5–6	4–3	4th (East)		
2009	Kutztown	3–8	1–6	7th (East)		
2010	Kutztown	10–2	6–1	2nd (East)	L NCAA Division II Second Round	13
2011	Kutztown	11–2	6–1	1st (East)	L NCAA Division II Second Round	13
2012	Kutztown	7–4	4–3	5th (East)		
Kutztown:		45–34	25–21			
Arkansas Tech Wonder Boys (Great American Conference) (2013–2018)
2013	Arkansas Tech	5–6	5–5	7th		
2014	Arkansas Tech	3–8	3–7	T–7th		
2015	Arkansas Tech	9–3	8–3	T–2nd		
2016	Arkansas Tech	6–5	6–5	6th		
2017	Arkansas Tech	8–4	8–3	T–2nd		
2018	Arkansas Tech	3–8	3–8	T–9th		
Arkansas Tech:		34–34	33–31			
Clarion Golden Eagles (Pennsylvania State Athletic Conference) (2022–present)
2022	Clarion	3–8	2–5	T–5th (West)		
2023	Clarion	2–9	1–6	T–6th (West)		
2024	Clarion	3–8	1–5	T–6th (West)		
2025	Clarion	6–5	2–4	T–5th (West)		
Clarion:		14–30	6–20			
Total:		93–98				
National championship Conference title Conference division title or championship game berth
