= List of Central Arkansas Bears in the NFL draft =

This is a list of Central Arkansas Bears football players in the NFL draft.

== Key ==
B	Back	K	Kicker	NT	Nose tackle
C	Center	LB	Linebacker	FB	Fullback
DB	Defensive back	P	Punter	HB	Halfback
DE	Defensive end	QB	Quarterback	WR	Wide receiver
DT	Defensive tackle	RB	Running back	G	Guard
E	End	T	Offensive tackle	TE	Tight end

== Selections ==
Year	Round	Pick	Player	Team	Position
1979	11	289	Monte Coleman	Washington Redskins	LB
1984	7	179	Nakita Robertson	Chicago Bears	RB
1985	12	312	Dave Burnette	Indianapolis Colts	DT
1992	9	229	David Henson	Phoenix Cardinals	DT
1993	7	176	Tyree Davis	Tampa Bay Buccaneers	WR
2007	6	204	Jacob Ford	Tennessee Titans	DE
2010	5	143	Larry Hart	Jacksonville Jaguars	DE
2011	6	194	Markell Carter	New England Patriots	LB
2015	7	234	Dezmin Lewis	Buffalo Bills	WR
2016	7	226	Jonathan Woodard	Jacksonville Jaguars	DE
2018	6	196	Tremon Smith	Kansas City Chiefs	DB
2021	4	130	Robert Rochell	Los Angeles Rams	DB
2025	4	121	David Walker	Tampa Bay Buccaneers	LB

== Notable undrafted players ==
Note: No drafts held before 1920

Debut year	Player name	Position	Debut NFL/AFL team	Notes
1938	Raymond Burnett	HB	Chicago Cardinals	
1944	Charles McGibbony	QB/TB	Brooklyn Tigers	
1986	Curtis Burrow	PK	New Orleans Saints	
1990	Willie Davis	WR	Kansas City Chiefs	
2009	Marquez Branson	TE	Denver Broncos	
2009	Nathan Brown	QB	Jacksonville Jaguars	
2018	George Odum	S	Indianapolis Colts	
2025	ShunDerrick Powell	RB	Philadelphia Eagles	
