= Steve Mullins =

American football coach (born c. 1957–1958)

Biographical details
- Born: c. 1957 or 1958 (age 68–69)
- Education: University of Arkansas at Monticello (1980)

Playing career
- 1976–1979: Arkansas–Monticello
- Position: Left tackle

Coaching career (HC unless noted)
- 1980–1981: Arkansas–Monticello (GA)
- 1982–1986: Arkansas–Monticello (OL)
- 1987: Northwest Missouri State (OL)
- 1988–1989: Northwest Missouri State (OC)
- 1990: Northwestern State (LB)
- 1991–1993: Northwestern State (OL)
- 1994–1996: Northwestern State (OC)
- 1997–2012: Arkansas Tech

Administrative career (AD unless noted)
- 2003–2019: Arkansas Tech

Head coaching record
- Overall: 96–75
- Tournaments: 2–3 (NCAA D-II playoffs)

Accomplishments and honors

Championships
- 1 GSC (1999)

Awards
- 3× First Team All-AIC (1977–1979); Arkansas–Monticello Hall of Fame (2002)

Steve Mullins (born c. 1957 or 1958) is an American former college football coach and athletic director. From 2003 to 2019 he served as the athletic director for Arkansas Tech University. From 1997 to 2012 he was the head football coach for Arkansas Tech. He also coached for Arkansas–Monticello, Northwest Missouri State, and Northwestern State. He played college football for Arkansas–Monticello as a left tackle.

== Head coaching record ==
Year	Team	Overall	Conference	Standing	Bowl/playoffs	AFCA^{#}
Arkansas Tech Wonder Boys (Gulf South Conference) (1997–2010)
1997	Arkansas Tech	4–7	4–4	6th		
1998	Arkansas Tech	5–5	4–5	T–5th		
1999	Arkansas Tech	9–3	8–1	1st	L NCAA Division II First Round	
2000	Arkansas Tech	7–3	7–2	4th		
2001	Arkansas Tech	8–2	7–2	T–2nd		16
2002	Arkansas Tech	4–7	3–6	T–8th		
2003	Arkansas Tech	5–6	4–5	T–5th		
2004	Arkansas Tech	10–2	8–1	2nd	L NCAA Division II Second Round	16
2005	Arkansas Tech	7–3	6–3	T–5th		
2006	Arkansas Tech	7–3	5–3	T–5th		
2007	Arkansas Tech	5–5	3–5	T–6th		
2008	Arkansas Tech	5–5	4–4	T–6th		
2009	Arkansas Tech	9–3	6–2	2nd	L NCAA Division II Second Round	18
2010	Arkansas Tech	4–7	2–6	T–9th		
Arkansas Tech Wonder Boys (Great American Conference) (2011–2012)
2011	Arkansas Tech	2–8	1–4	8th		
2012	Arkansas Tech	5–6	3–5	6th		
Arkansas Tech:		96–75	75–58			
Total:		96–75				
National championship Conference title Conference division title or championship game berth
