= Terry Bowden =

American football player and coach (born 1956)

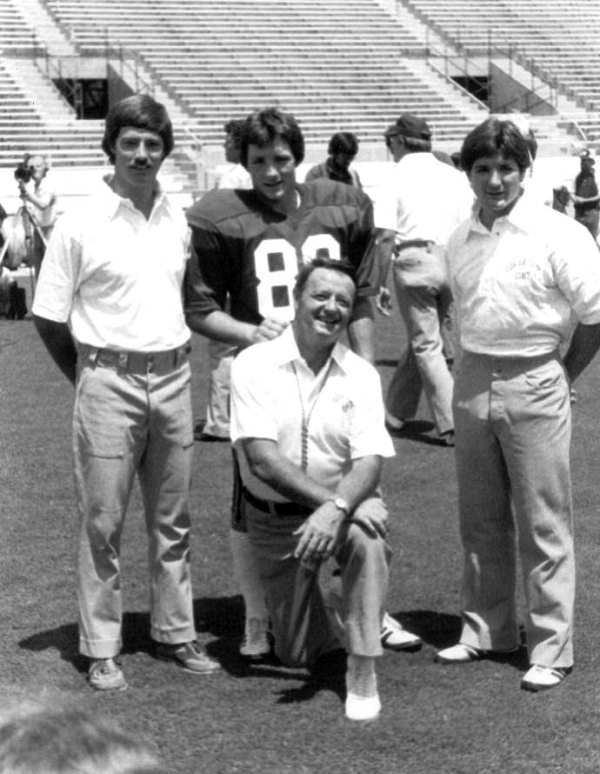
- Bobby Bowden and sons pictured in 1982. Terry Bowden is on the far right.

Current position
- Title: Head coach
- Team: Monroe Greenheads
- Conference: The Arena League
- Record: 4-4

Biographical details
- Born: February 25, 1956 (age 70); Douglas, Georgia, U.S.

Playing career
- 1977–1978: West Virginia
- Position: Running back

Coaching career (HC unless noted)
- 1982: Florida State (GA)
- 1983–1985: Salem
- 1986: Akron (QB)
- 1987–1992: Samford
- 1993–1998: Auburn
- 2009–2011: North Alabama
- 2012–2018: Akron
- 2019–2020: Clemson (GA)
- 2021–2023: Louisiana–Monroe
- 2024–2026: Delhi Charter School (LA) (assistant)
- 2026-: Monroe Greenheads

Head coaching record
- Overall: 185–140–2
- Bowls: 3–2
- Tournaments: 2–2 (NCAA D-IAA playoffs); 2–2 (NCAA D-II playoffs)

Accomplishments and honors

Championships
- 1 National (1993); 2 WVIAC (1984, 1985); 2 SEC Western Division Titles (*1993,1997); 1 Gulf South (2009); 1 MAC East Division (2017)

Awards
- Eddie Robinson Coach of the Year (1993); George Munger Award (1993); Paul "Bear" Bryant Award (1993); Sporting News College Football COY (1993); Walter Camp Coach of the Year (1993); SEC Coach of the Year (1993); Gulf South Co-Coach of The Year (2009)

Terry Wilson Bowden (/ˈbaʊdən/; born February 25, 1956) is a former American college football coach and current arena football coach who is the head coach of the Monroe Greenheads. He was most recently the head football coach at the University of Louisiana at Monroe, a position he held until the conclusion of the 2023 season. Bowden was the head football coach at Salem University (1983–1985), Samford University (1987–1992), Auburn University (1993–1998), the University of North Alabama (2009–2011), and the University of Akron (2012–2018). He is a son of former Florida State University head football coach Bobby Bowden and a brother of Tommy Bowden, former head football coach at Clemson University, and Jeff Bowden, the former offensive coordinator at Florida State.

== Education ==
Bowden attended and played football for West Virginia University, where he was a member of Phi Kappa Psi fraternity, and graduated magna cum laude with a degree in accounting. His father, Bobby Bowden, was the Mountaineers' head coach until 1975, and Bowden lettered twice as a running back for his father's successor, Frank Cignetti, Sr. In addition to post-graduate work at Oxford University, Bowden also received his Juris Doctor degree from Florida State University College of Law in 1982 and a master's in athletic leadership from Clemson in 2021.

== Career ==
Terry Bowden began his coaching career as a graduate assistant at Florida State before becoming the nation's youngest head coach at age 26 when he accepted the position at Salem College in 1983. While at Salem, he won two West Virginia Intercollegiate Athletic Conference titles. In 1986, Bowden left to be an assistant coach at The University of Akron for Gerry Faust. In 1987, Bowden became the head coach at Samford University, a school where his father played and coached. At Samford, Bowden directed the program's move from Division III football to Division I-AA scholarship football. In 1991, Bowden's Samford team reached the I-AA semifinals.

=== Auburn ===
In 1992, Bowden was hired to succeed Pat Dye as the head football coach at Auburn University. Bowden's hiring occurred while the program faced NCAA sanctions, which included scholarship reductions, a one-year television ban, and a two-year postseason ban.

During his first year at Auburn in 1993, Bowden led the Tigers to a perfect 11–0 season, becoming the first coach to go undefeated in his debut season at a Division I school. In 1994, Auburn finished 9–1–1, establishing the longest winning streak in school history at 20 games. That same year, Bowden was honored with membership into Omicron Delta Kappa - the National Leadership Honor Society.

In 1997, Auburn reached the SEC Championship Game, where they held as much as a 20–7 lead, but lost, giving up a fourth quarter 73-yard touchdown pass by Peyton Manning of the Tennessee Volunteers.

In 1998, Bowden's fate at Auburn changed as he faced criticism for recruiting woes, off-the-field issues that resulted in player discipline, and in his relationships with Auburn administrators, including board of trustees member Bobby Lowder. These issues, combined with a string of player injuries, led to a disastrous start of the 1998 season. After starting with a 1–5 record, Bowden resigned as head coach the night before Auburn played against Louisiana Tech. In conversations with athletic director David Housel, Bowden was given no assurances he would have a chance to remedy the situation for the next season, and that he believed his termination was imminent. The team was coached for the remainder of the season by Bill Oliver. On July 24, 2013, an article in The Auburn Villager newspaper claimed, a novel titled "The Legend's Son" is a thinly disguised satire of Bowden's rise and fall at Auburn.

=== Broadcasting career ===
After resigning at Auburn, Bowden accepted a role as a studio analyst and color commentator for ABC Sports' college football coverage where he often referred to his father Bobby Bowden as "Daddy." He was also an exclusive college football columnist for Yahoo! Sports. For a period, Bowden also hosted a sports talk radio show in the Orlando, Florida area. In 2006, Bowden became the expert analyst for Westwood One radio network's College Football National Game of Week. He also co-hosted "The Coaches Show" on Sirius Satellite Radio with Jack Arute and worked several times a month as a motivational speaker.

In a July 30, 2007, column, writing a few weeks before the 2007 college football season, Bowden said he was eager to go back to coaching for the 2008 football season. In December 2007, the coaching job at his alma mater West Virginia opened up: Rich Rodriguez left to be Michigan's coach. Bowden issued a statement which read in part, "Coming home to West Virginia would obviously be the dream job for me." However, West Virginia offered the job to one of Rodriguez's assistants, Bill Stewart, who was the interim head coach when the Mountaineers upset the Oklahoma Sooners in the 2008 Fiesta Bowl. In late 2007, Bowden interviewed for the head coaching job at Georgia Tech, which ultimately went to Paul Johnson.

Bowden returned to the broadcasting booth for the 2008 season. At the end of the year, Bowden took the head coach position at a Division II school, North Alabama.

=== North Alabama ===
On December 31, 2008, it was announced that he would be the next head football coach at the University of North Alabama in Florence. He was officially introduced as the head football coach at the University Center on January 1, 2009. Bowden was tapped to replace Mark Hudspeth, who left after directing the Lions to a 66–21 record and a third berth in seven years in the national playoff semifinals to become the passing game coordinator at Mississippi State University under new head coach Dan Mullen. During Bowden's tenure at North Alabama he guided the Lions to three appearances in the NCAA Division II Playoffs.

=== Akron ===
On December 22, 2011, it was announced Bowden would be hired as the next head football coach at the University of Akron, and he was formally introduced on December 28, 2011. He replaced Rob Ianello as the Zips' head coach, who was fired on November 26 after compiling a 2–22 record in two seasons. In his first year, Bowden duplicated Ianello's 1–11 record from 2011.

On September 14, 2013, Bowden led Akron against Michigan in Ann Arbor and came within a few yards of defeating the Wolverines. The Zips lost, 28–24, after an incomplete pass from the Wolverines' three-yard line on the final play of the game went out of the back of the end zone. Akron led at various points during the game: 10–7 in the third quarter after a 28-yard passing touchdown from Kyle Pohl to Zach D'Orazio; and 24–21 in the fourth quarter after a one-yard pass from Pohl to Tyrell Goodman. Bowden's 2013 team showed improvement, compiling a 5–7 record on the season and snapping the nation's longest road losing streak (28) with a 24–17 victory against the Miami RedHawks. For the signs of improvement shown by the Zips, Akron extended Bowden's contract by two years through 2017. Bowden led the Zips to an 8–5 season in 2015, his first winning season as Akron's coach. He also got Akron their first ever bowl game victory against Utah State in the Famous Idaho Potato Bowl.

On September 15, 2018, Bowden led Akron to the school's first victory over a Big Ten opponent since 1894 (when Akron, then known as Buchtel College, defeated Ohio State 12–6), defeating Northwestern 39–34 on the road. After the Zips finished the season with a 4–8 record, he was fired on December 2, 2018.

=== Clemson ===
In June 2019, Bowden joined the Clemson Tigers staff as an unpaid intern in addition to attending the university to receive a graduate degree.

=== Louisiana–Monroe ===
Bowden was named head football coach at the University of Louisiana at Monroe on December 23, 2020. Louisiana–Monroe fired Bowden on November 26, 2023, after three years and a record of 10–26.

== Head coaching record ==
Year	Team	Overall	Conference	Standing	Bowl/playoffs	Coaches^{#}	AP^{°}
Salem Tigers (West Virginia Intercollegiate Athletic Conference) (1983–1985)
1983	Salem	3–7	2–6	T–7th			
1984	Salem	8–3	7–1	T–1st			
1985	Salem	8–3	6–1	1st			
Salem:		19–13	15–8				
Samford Bulldogs (NCAA Division III independent) (1987–1988)
1987	Samford	9–1					
1988	Samford	5–6					
Samford Bulldogs (NCAA Division I-AA independent) (1989–1992)
1989	Samford	4–7					
1990	Samford	6–4–1					
1991	Samford	12–2			L NCAA Division I-AA Semifinal		
1992	Samford	9–3			L NCAA Division I-AA First Round		
Samford:		45–23–1					
Auburn Tigers (Southeastern Conference) (1993–1998)
1993	Auburn	11–0	8–0	1st (Western) ‡	‡	‡	4
1994	Auburn	9–1–1	6–1–1	2nd (Western) ‡	‡	‡	9
1995	Auburn	8–4	5–3	2nd (Western)	L Outback	21	22
1996	Auburn	8–4	4–4	3rd (Western)	W Independence	25	24
1997	Auburn	10–3	6–2	T–1st (Western)	W Peach	11	11
1998	Auburn	1–5 (Note: Bowden resigned after six games. Bill Oliver was appointed interim head coach and led Auburn for the remaining five games of the season.)	1–4	6th (Western)			
Auburn:		47–17–1	30–14–1	‡ Ineligible for SEC title, bowl game and Coaches' Poll			
North Alabama Lions (Gulf South Conference) (2009–2011)
2009	North Alabama	11–2	7–1	1st	L NCAA Division II Quarterfinal		
2010	North Alabama	9–4	5–3	T–4th	L NCAA Division II Second Round		
2011	North Alabama	9–3	2–2	T–2nd	L NCAA Division II Second Round		
North Alabama:		29–9	14–6				
Akron Zips (Mid-American Conference) (2012–2018)
2012	Akron	1–11	0–8	7th (East)			
2013	Akron	5–7	4–4	T–3rd (East)			
2014	Akron	5–7	3–5	4th (East)			
2015	Akron	8–5	5–3	T–2nd (East)	W Famous Idaho Potato		
2016	Akron	5–7	3–5	T–3rd (East)			
2017	Akron	7–7	6–2	1st (East)	L Boca Raton		
2018	Akron	4–8	2–6	T–4th (East)			
Akron:		35–52	23–33				
Louisiana–Monroe Warhawks (Sun Belt Conference) (2021–2023)
2021	Louisiana–Monroe	4–8	2–6	T–3rd (West)			
2022	Louisiana–Monroe	4–8	3–5	5th (West)			
2023	Louisiana–Monroe	2–10	0–8	7th (West)			
Louisiana–Monroe:		10–26	5–19				
Total:		185–140–2					
National championship Conference title Conference division title or championship game berth
^{#}Rankings from final Coaches Poll.; ^{°}Rankings from final AP Poll.
