= 2009 North Alabama Lions football team =

American college football season

2009 North Alabama Lions football

GSC champion

NCAA Division II Quarterfinal, L 21–24 vs. Carson–Newman
- Conference: Gulf South Conference
- Record: 11–2 (7–1 GSC)
- Head coach: Terry Bowden (1st season)
- Offensive coordinator: Alan Arrington (2nd season)
- Defensive coordinator: Karl Morgan (5th season)
- Home stadium: Braly Municipal Stadium

2009 Gulf South Conference football standings
	Conf.			Overall
Team	W		L	W		L
No. 6 North Alabama $^	7	–	1	11	–	2
No. 18 Arkansas Tech ^	6	–	2	9	–	3
No. 21 West Alabama ^	5	–	3	8	–	5
Valdosta State	5	–	3	6	–	4
Ouachita Baptist	4	–	4	6	–	4
Delta State	4	–	4	5	–	5
Arkansas–Monticello	4	–	4	5	–	6
Harding	3	–	5	5	–	6
Henderson State	3	–	5	3	–	7
Southern Arkansas	2	–	6	3	–	7
West Georgia	1	–	7	1	–	9
$ – Conference champion; ^ – NCAA Division II playoff participant; Rankings from AFCA poll

The 2009 North Alabama Lions football team represented the University of North Alabama as a member of the Gulf South Conference (GSC) during the 2009 NCAA Division II football season. Led by first-year head coach Terry Bowden, the Lions compiled an overall record of 11–2 with a mark of 7–1 in conference play, winning the GSC title. For the fifth straight season, North Alabama advanced to the NCAA Division II football championship playoffs, where, after a first round by, the Lions defeated GSC runner-up Arkansas Tech in the second round before losing to Carson–Newman in the quarterfinals. The team played home games at Braly Municipal Stadium in Florence, Alabama.

== Schedule ==
Date	Time	Opponent	Rank	Site	TV	Result	Attendance
August 29	7:00 p.m.	at Southern Arkansas*	No. 6	Wilkins Stadium; Magnolia, AR		W 41–9	5,201
September 5	6:00 p.m.	No. 22 Carson–Newman*	No. 4	Braly Municipal Stadium; Florence, AL		W 31–14	11,543
September 12	6:00 p.m.	at Henderson State	No. 3	Carpenter–Haygood Stadium; Arkadelphia, AR		W 43–26	3,978
September 19	6:00 p.m.	West Georgia	No. 3	Braly Municipal Stadium; Florence, AL		W 55–7	9,548
September 26	7:00 p.m.	at Harding	No. 3	First Security Stadium; Searcy, AR		W 38–0	2,836
October 3	6:00 p.m.	Arkansas Tech^{†}	No. 3	Braly Municipal Stadium; Florence, AL		W 42–17	12,054
October 8	7:00 p.m.	North Greenville*	No. 3	Braly Municipal Stadium; Florence, AL		W 50-3	7,465
October 15	7:00 p.m.	Delta State	No. 2	Braly Municipal Stadium; Florence, AL	CSS	W 34–24	9,210
October 22	7:00 p.m.	at Valdosta State	No. 1	Bazemore–Hyder Stadium; Valdosta, GA	CBS College Sports	W 62–27	5,132
October 31	6:00 p.m.	at Arkansas–Monticello	No. 1	Cotton Boll Stadium; Monticello, AR		W 27–13	2,495
November 7	6:00 p.m.	West Alabama	No. 1	Braly Municipal Stadium; Florence, AL (rivalry)		L 28–31 ^{4OT}	10,652
November 21	12:00 p.m.	No. 21 Arkansas Tech*	No. 5	Braly Municipal Stadium; Florence, AL (NCAA Division II Second Round)		W 41–28	6,432
November 28	12:00 p.m.	No. 10 Carson–Newman*	No. 5	Braly Municipal Stadium; Florence, AL (NCAA Division II Quarterfinal)		L 21–24	8,211
*Non-conference game; ^{†}Homecoming; Rankings from AFCA Poll released prior to the game; All times are in Central time
