= Arkansas Tech Wonder Boys football =

College football team

- First season: 1911; 115 years ago
- Athletic director: Abby Davis
- Head coach: Roy Thompson Jr. 2nd season, 7–5 (.583)
- Location: Russellville, Arkansas
- Stadium: Thone Stadium (capacity: 6,500)
- Field: Simmons Bank Field
- NCAA division: Division II
- Conference: Great American
- Colors: Green and gold
- All-time record: 584–416–45 (.580)

Conference championships
- 14
- Rivalries: Central Arkansas Bears; Harding Bisons; Southern Arkansas Muleriders
- Mascot: Jerry the Bulldog
- Website: arkansastechsports.com

The Arkansas Tech Wonder Boys football team represents Arkansas Tech University in college football at the NCAA Division II level. The Wonder Boys are members of the Great American Conference (GAC), fielding its team in the GAC since 2011. The Wonder Boys play their home games at Simmons Bank Field at Thone Stadium in Russellville, Arkansas.

Their head coach is Roy Thompson Jr., who took over the position for the 2025 season.

== History ==
John Tucker is ultimately responsible for the idiosyncratic nickname "Wonder Boys" for Arkansas Tech University. On November 15, 1919, Tucker, as a 17-year-old freshman, scored two touchdowns and kicked two extra points to lead the Second District Agricultural School Aggies to a 14–0 upset win over Jonesboro. In newspaper accounts following the game, Tucker and his teammates were referred to as "Wonder Boys," and the nickname remains to this day. Tucker was labeled as "The Original Wonder Boy" and was associated with the school for the rest of his life. He went on to play on the University of Alabama's Rose Bowl team in 1931 and served Arkansas Tech in a variety of roles – including coach, athletic director and chemistry professor – between 1925 and 1972. Two buildings on the Tech campus – Tucker Coliseum and Tucker Hall – are named in his honor.

== Postseason and championships ==
Originally the Second District Agricultural School when formed in 1909, Arkansas Tech has made five appearances in football national playoffs (1971, 1994, 1999, 2004 and 2009). Led by All-American receiver Rick Thone, the 1971 Wonder Boys (12–1–0) made it to the national championship game of the NAIA playoffs, losing to Livingston State (now West Alabama) in the title game, 12–14, played in Birmingham, Alabama. In 1994, Tech lost in the first round of the NAIA playoffs to Langston, 42–56, after capturing the final Arkansas Intercollegiate Conference (AIC) football crown earlier that season. Firman W. Bynum, long-time Dean of Men at Tech, was the school's first All-American football player in 1939.

Tech won AIC football championships in 1931, 1935, 1939, 1945, 1946, 1947, 1948, 1949, 1954, 1958, 1960, 1961, 1964, 1968, 1970, 1971 and 1994.

Arkansas Tech left the NAIA after the AIC disbanded following the 1994–95 academic year. Tech joined NCAA Division II and the Gulf South Conference at that time. Since then, Tech's football program has made appearances in the NCAA Division II Playoffs in 1999, 2004 and 2009. The 1999 team was the first from Arkansas to win the GSC football championship outright, while the 2004 Wonder Boys were the first team from Arkansas to host or win an NCAA Division II playoff game. Tech earned that honor by defeating Catawba 24–20 on November 13, 2004. The Wonder Boys returned to the NCAA Division II playoffs in 2009 and defeated the UNC Pembroke 41–13 in the first round before falling to North Alabama 28–41 in the regional semifinals.

After the 2025 regular season, Arkansas Tech played in the Heritage Bowl in Corsicana, Texas against West Texas A&M. The Wonder Boys lost to the Buffaloes 27–28.

== Conference affiliations ==
- Independent (1911–1927)
- Arkansas Intercollegiate Conference (1928–1955)
- Independent (1956–1957)
- Arkansas Intercollegiate Conference (1958–1994)
- Gulf South Conference (1995–2010)
- Great American Conference (2011–present)

== List of head coaches ==
=== Key ===
Key to symbols in coaches list
General		Overall		Conference		Postseason (Note: Although the first Rose Bowl Game was played in 1902, it has been continuously played since the 1916 game, and is recognized as the oldest bowl game by the NCAA. "—" indicates any season prior to 1916 when postseason games were not played.)	
No.	Order of coaches (Note: A running total of the number of head coaches, with coaches who served separate tenures being counted only once. Interim head coaches are represented with "Int" and are not counted in the running total. "—" indicates the team played but either without a coach or no coach is on record. "X" indicates an interim year without play.)	GC	Games coached	CW	Conference wins	PW	Postseason wins
DC	Division championships	OW	Overall wins	CL	Conference losses	PL	Postseason losses
CC	Conference championships	OL	Overall losses	CT	Conference ties	PT	Postseason ties
NC	National championships	OT	Overall ties (Note: Overtime rules in college football were introduced in 1996, making ties impossible in the period since.)	C%	Conference winning percentage		
†	Elected to the College Football Hall of Fame	O%	Overall winning percentage (Note: When computing the win–loss percentage, a tie counts as half a win and half a loss.)				

=== Coaches ===
List of head football coaches showing season(s) coached, overall records and conference records
No.	Name	Season(s)	GC	OW	OL	OT	O%	CW	CL	CT	C%
1	William A. Isgrig	1911	7	4	3	0	0.571	–	–	–	–
2	Erwin H. Shinn	1912–1915	32	24	7	1	0.766	–	–	–	–
3	Walter B. Casey	1916–1917	3	1	1	1	0.500	–	–	–	–
4	D. K. McWilliams	1919	5	2	2	1	0.500	–	–	–	–
5	Edgar O. Brown	1920–1932	110	77	21	12	0.755	–	–	–	–
6	John Tucker	1933–1941, 1945–1947	102	74	17	11	0.779	46	13	7	0.750
7	Raymond Burnett	1948–1953	57	30	24	3	0.553	–	–	–	–
8	Sam Hindsman	1954–1958	49	31	16	2	0.653	–	–	–	–
9	Marvin Salmon	1959–1966	78	53	20	5	0.712	37	10	2	0.776
10	Don Dempsey	1967–1975	98	54	41	3	0.566	30	22	2	0.574
11	Leon Anderson	1976–1979	41	15	25	1	0.378	8	15	1	0.354
12	Harold Steelman	1980–1985	59	22	35	2	0.390	16	20	1	0.446
13	Ken Stephens	1986–1992	68	29	37	2	0.441	14	28	1	0.337
14	Brooks Hollingsworth	1993–1996	42	16	25	1	0.393	10	14	1	0.420
15	Steve Mullins	1997–2012	171	96	75	0	0.561	75	58	0	0.564
16	Raymond Monica	2013–2018	68	34	34	0	0.500	33	31	0	0.516
17	Kyle Shipp	2019–2024	55	22	33	0	0.400	22	33	0	0.400
18	Roy Thompson Jr.	2025–present	12	7	5	0	0.583	7	4	0	0.636

== Year-by-year results ==
National champions	Conference champions	Bowl game berth	Playoff berth

Season	Year	Head coach	Association	Division	Conference	Record							Postseason	Final ranking
Season	Year	Head coach	Association	Division	Conference	Overall			Conference				Postseason	Final ranking
Season	Year	Head coach	Association	Division	Conference	Win	Loss	Tie	Finish	Win	Loss	Tie	Postseason	Final ranking
Arkansas Tech Wonder Boys
1911	1911	William A. Isgrig	NCAA	—	Independent	4	3	0					—	—
1912	1912	Erwin H. Shinn	NCAA	—	Independent	4	2	0					—	—
1913	1913	Erwin H. Shinn	NCAA	—	Independent	7	2	1					—	—
1914	1914	Erwin H. Shinn	NCAA	—	Independent	8	0	0					—	—
1915	1915	Erwin H. Shinn	NCAA	—	Independent	5	3	0					—	—
1916	1916	Walter B. Casey	NCAA	—	Independent	1	0	1					—	—
1917	1917	Walter B. Casey	NCAA	—	Independent	0	1	0					—	—
No team in 1918
1919	1919	D. K. McWilliams	NCAA	—	Independent	2	2	1					—	—
1920	1920	Edgar O. Brown	NCAA	—	Independent	4	0	2					—	—
1921	1921	Edgar O. Brown	NCAA	—	Independent	7	0	0					—	—
1922	1922	Edgar O. Brown	NCAA	—	Independent	8	1	0					—	—
1923	1923	Edgar O. Brown	NCAA	—	Independent	6	1	1					—	—
1924	1924	Edgar O. Brown	NCAA	—	Independent	6	1	2					—	—
1925	1925	Edgar O. Brown	NCAA	—	Independent	7	2	0					—	—
1926	1926	Edgar O. Brown	NCAA	—	Independent	6	2	0					—	—
1927	1927	Edgar O. Brown	NCAA	—	Independent	5	1	0					—	—
1928	1928	Edgar O. Brown	NCAA	—	AIC	7	2	0					—	—
1929	1929	Edgar O. Brown	NCAA	—	AIC	4	4	1	5th	2	2	1	—	—
1930	1930	Edgar O. Brown	NCAA	—	AIC	5	2	2	T–3rd	3	1	2	—	—
1931	1931	Edgar O. Brown	NCAA	—	AIC	7	1	2	1st	5	0	2	W Border Bowl	—
1932	1932	Edgar O. Brown	NCAA	—	AIC	6	2	1	2nd	5	2	0	—	—
1933	1933	John Tucker	NCAA	—	AIC	3	3	1	6th	2	3	1	—	—
1934	1934	John Tucker	NCAA	—	AIC	5	1	2	2nd	4	1	2	—	—
1935	1935	John Tucker	NCAA	—	AIC	8	0	1	1st	6	0	1	—	—
1936	1936	John Tucker	NCAA	—	AIC	6	2	0	2nd	5	1	0	—	—
1937	1937	John Tucker	NCAA	—	AIC	8	1	0	2nd	3	1	0	—	—
1938	1938	John Tucker	NCAA	—	AIC	4	2	2	3rd	2	2	0	—	—
1939	1939	John Tucker	NCAA	—	AIC	7	0	2	1st	2	0	2	—	—
1940	1940	John Tucker	NCAA	—	AIC	5	3	1	3rd	1	2	1	—	—
1941	1941	John Tucker	NCAA	—	AIC	6	3	0	2nd	3	3	0	—	—
No team from 1942 to 1944
1945	1945	John Tucker	NCAA	—	AIC	8	0	0	1st	6	0	0	—	—
1946	1946	John Tucker	NCAA	—	AIC	9	1	0	1st	6	0	0	—	—
1947	1947	John Tucker	NCAA	—	AIC	8	1	0	1st	6	0	0	—	—
1948	1948	Raymond Burnett	NCAA	—	AIC	8	2	0	1st	6	0	0	—	—
1949	1949	Raymond Burnett	NCAA	—	AIC	9	1	1	1st	8	0	0	—	—
1950	1950	Raymond Burnett	NCAA	—	AIC	6	3	1	4th	4	3	0	—	—
1951	1951	Raymond Burnett	NCAA	—	AIC	3	6	0	7th	2	5	0	—	—
1952	1952	Raymond Burnett	NCAA	—	AIC	1	7	0	5th	1	4	0	—	—
1953	1953	Raymond Burnett	NCAA	—	AIC	3	5	1	6th	1	3	1	—	—
1954	1954	Sam Hindsman	NCAA	—	AIC	8	1	0	1st	6	1	0	—	—
1955	1955	Sam Hindsman	NCAA	—	AIC	5	3	2	6th	5	1	1	—	—
1956	1956	Sam Hindsman	NAIA	—	Independent	5	5	0					—	—
1957	1957	Sam Hindsman	NAIA	—	Independent	6	4	0					W Rice Bowl	—
1958	1958	Sam Hindsman	NAIA	—	AIC	7	3	0	T–1st	6	1	0	L Rice Bowl	—
1959	1959	Marvin Salmon	NAIA	—	AIC	5	3	0	4th	4	3	0	—	—
1960	1960	Marvin Salmon	NAIA	—	AIC	10	1	0	1st	8	0	0	L Great Southwest Bowl	20
1961	1961	Marvin Salmon	NAIA	—	AIC	8	0	1	1st	6	0	1	—	17
1962	1962	Marvin Salmon	NAIA	—	AIC	8	1	1	2nd	6	1	0	—	—
1963	1963	Marvin Salmon	NAIA	—	AIC	3	5	2	5th	3	3	1	—	—
1964	1964	Marvin Salmon	NAIA	—	AIC	9	1	0	1st	7	0	0	—	16
1965	1965	Marvin Salmon	NAIA	—	AIC	7	3	0	3rd	5	2	0	—	—
1966	1966	Marvin Salmon	NAIA	—	AIC	3	6	1	7th	2	4	0	—	—
1967	1967	Don Dempsey	NAIA	—	AIC	5	3	1	2nd	3	2	1	—	—
1968	1968	Don Dempsey	NAIA	—	AIC	10	2	0	1st	5	1	0	L AIC Bowl	4
1969	1969	Don Dempsey	NAIA	—	AIC	6	4	1	2nd	4	1	1	—	—
1970	1970	Don Dempsey	NAIA	Division I	AIC	8	3	0	T–1st	5	1	0	—	—
1971	1971	Don Dempsey	NAIA	Division I	AIC	12	1	0	1st	6	0	0	L Champion Bowl	2
1972	1972	Don Dempsey	NAIA	Division I	AIC	5	4	1	3rd	4	2	0	—	—
1973	1973	Don Dempsey	NAIA	Division I	AIC	4	7	0	T–5th	2	4	0	—	—
1974	1974	Don Dempsey	NAIA	Division I	AIC	1	9	0	7th	0	6	0	—	—
1975	1975	Don Dempsey	NAIA	Division I	AIC	3	8	0	6th	1	5	0	—	—
1976	1976	Leon Anderson	NAIA	Division I	AIC	1	10	0	7th	0	6	0	—	—
1977	1977	Leon Anderson	NAIA	Division I	AIC	6	4	0	T–3rd	3	3	0	—	—
1978	1978	Leon Anderson	NAIA	Division I	AIC	5	5	0	5th	2	4	0	—	—
1979	1979	Leon Anderson	NAIA	Division I	AIC	3	6	1	3rd	3	2	1	—	—
1980	1980	Harold Steelman	NAIA	Division I	AIC	6	4	0	3rd	4	2	0	—	—
1981	1981	Harold Steelman	NAIA	Division I	AIC	4	5	1	T–5th	2	4	0	—	—
1982	1982	Harold Steelman	NAIA	Division I	AIC	3	7	0	T–5th	2	4	0	—	—
1983	1983	Harold Steelman	NAIA	Division I	AIC	4	5	1	2nd	4	1	1	—	—
1984	1984	Harold Steelman	NAIA	Division I	AIC	4	5	0	T–4th	3	3	0	—	—
1985	1985	Harold Steelman	NAIA	Division I	AIC	1	9	0	7th	1	6	0	—	—
1986	1986	Ken Stephens	NAIA	Division I	AIC	6	4	0	T–2nd	5	2	0	—	—
1987	1987	Ken Stephens	NAIA	Division I	AIC	2	6	1	7th	1	4	1	—	—
1988	1988	Ken Stephens	NAIA	Division I	AIC	6	4	0	3rd	3	3	0	—	—
1989	1989	Ken Stephens	NAIA	Division I	AIC	6	3	0	4th	3	3	0	—	—
1990	1990	Ken Stephens	NAIA	Division I	AIC	4	6	0	7th	0	6	0	—	—
1991	1991	Ken Stephens	NAIA	Division I	AIC	0	10	0	7th	0	6	0	—	—
1992	1992	Ken Stephens	NAIA	Division I	AIC	4	5	1	5th	2	4	0	—	—
1993	1993	Brooks Hollingsworth	NAIA	Division I	AIC	1	9	0	4th	1	3	0	—	—
1994	1994	Brooks Hollingsworth	NAIA	Division I	AIC	7	4	0	1st	4	0	0	L NAIA Division I First Round	—
1995	1995	Brooks Hollingsworth	NCAA	Division II	GSC	3	6	1	8th	2	6	1	—	—
1996	1996	Brooks Hollingsworth	NCAA	Division II	GSC	5	6	0	T–7th	3	5	0	—	—
1997	1997	Steve Mullins	NCAA	Division II	GSC	4	7	0	6th	4	4	0	—	—
1998	1998	Steve Mullins	NCAA	Division II	GSC	5	5	0	T–5th	4	5	0	—	—
1999	1999	Steve Mullins	NCAA	Division II	GSC	9	3	0	1st	8	1	0	L NCAA Division II First Round	—
2000	2000	Steve Mullins	NCAA	Division II	GSC	7	3	0	4th	7	2	0	—	—
2001	2001	Steve Mullins	NCAA	Division II	GSC	8	2	0	T–2nd	7	2	0	—	16
2002	2002	Steve Mullins	NCAA	Division II	GSC	4	7	0	T–8th	3	6	0	—	—
2003	2003	Steve Mullins	NCAA	Division II	GSC	5	6	0	T–5th	4	5	0	—	—
2004	2004	Steve Mullins	NCAA	Division II	GSC	10	2	0	2nd	8	1	0	L NCAA Division II Second Round	16
2005	2005	Steve Mullins	NCAA	Division II	GSC	7	3	0	T–5th	6	3	0	—	—
2006	2006	Steve Mullins	NCAA	Division II	GSC	7	3	0	T–5th	5	3	0	—	—
2007	2007	Steve Mullins	NCAA	Division II	GSC	5	5	0	T–6th	3	5	0	—	—
2008	2008	Steve Mullins	NCAA	Division II	GSC	5	5	0	T–6th	4	4	0	—	—
2009	2009	Steve Mullins	NCAA	Division II	GSC	9	3	0	2nd	6	2	0	L NCAA Division II Second Round	18
2010	2010	Steve Mullins	NCAA	Division II	GSC	4	7	0	T–9th	2	6	0	—	—
2011	2011	Steve Mullins	NCAA	Division II	GAC	2	8	0	8th	1	4	0	—	—
2012	2012	Steve Mullins	NCAA	Division II	GAC	5	6	0	6th	3	5	0	—	—
2013	2013	Raymond Monica	NCAA	Division II	GAC	5	6	0	7th	5	5	0	—	—
2014	2014	Raymond Monica	NCAA	Division II	GAC	3	8	0	T–7th	3	7	0	—	—
2015	2015	Raymond Monica	NCAA	Division II	GAC	9	3	0	T–2nd	8	3	0	W HOT Bowl	—
2016	2016	Raymond Monica	NCAA	Division II	GAC	6	5	0	6th	6	5	0	—	—
2017	2017	Raymond Monica	NCAA	Division II	GAC	8	4	0	T–2nd	8	3	0	L Live United Texarkana Bowl	—
2018	2018	Raymond Monica	NCAA	Division II	GAC	3	8	0	T–9th	3	8	0	—	—
2019	2019	Kyle Shipp	NCAA	Division II	GAC	3	8	0	T–8th	3	8	0	—	—
No team in 2020 due to COVID-19
2021	2021	Kyle Shipp	NCAA	Division II	GAC	4	7	0	T–8th	4	7	0	—	—
2022	2022	Kyle Shipp	NCAA	Division II	GAC	5	6	0	T–6th	5	6	0	—	—
2023	2023	Kyle Shipp	NCAA	Division II	GAC	5	6	0	T–7th	5	6	0	—	—
2024	2024	Kyle Shipp	NCAA	Division II	GAC	5	6	0	T–5th	5	6	0	—	—
2025	2025	Roy Thompson Jr.	NCAA	Division II	GAC	7	5	0	T–4th	7	4	0	L Heritage Bowl	—
