= 1946 Arkansas Intercollegiate Conference football season =

- Sport: Football
- Teams: 8
- Champion: Arkansas Tech

Football seasons
- 1945 1947

1946 Arkansas Intercollegiate Conference football standings
| | Conf. | | | | | Overall |
| Team | W | | L | | T | W | | L | | T |
|---|---|---|---|---|---|---|---|---|---|---|
| Arkansas Tech $ | 6 | – | 0 | – | 0 | 9 | – | 1 | – | 0 |
| Ouachita Baptist | 5 | – | 1 | – | 0 | 5 | – | 4 | – | 0 |
| Henderson State | 4 | – | 2 | – | 0 | 6 | – | 3 | – | 1 |
| Magnolia A&M | 3 | – | 2 | – | 0 | 4 | – | 5 | – | 0 |
| Ozarks | 2 | – | 4 | – | 0 | 2 | – | 7 | – | 0 |
| Arkansas State Teachers | 1 | – | 3 | – | 0 | 2 | – | 6 | – | 0 |
| Hendrix | 1 | – | 5 | – | 0 | 1 | – | 8 | – | 0 |
| Monticello A&M | 1 | – | 6 | – | 0 | 1 | – | 6 | – | 1 |
$ – Conference champion

The 1946 Arkansas Intercollegiate Conference football season was the season of college football played by the eight member schools of the Arkansas Intercollegiate Conference (AIC) as part of the 1946 college football season. Led by head coach John Tucker, the Arkansas Tech Wonder Boys from Russellville, Arkansas, compiled a 9–1 record and won the AIC championship. None of the AIC teams was ranked in the Associated Press poll or played in a bowl game.

== Conference overview ==
| Conf. rank | Team | Head coach | Conf. record | Overall record | Points scored | Points against |
|---|---|---|---|---|---|---|
| 1 | Arkansas Tech | John Tucker | 5–0 | 9–1 | 253 | 51 |
| 2 | Ouachita Baptist | Robert A. Cowan | 5–1 | 5–4 | 163 | 121 |
| 3 | Henderson State | Duke Wells | 4–2 | 6–3–1 | 142 | 131 |
| 4 | Magnolia A&M | Elmer Smith | 3–2 | 4–5 | 158 | 98 |
| 5 | Ozarks | Frank Koon | 2–4 | 2–7 | 44 | 250 |
| 6 | Arkansas State Teachers | Charles McGibbony | 1–3 | 2–6 | 57 | 139 |
| 7 | Hendrix | Ivan Grove | 1–5 | 1–8 | 36 | 230 |
| 8 | Monticello A&M | Doug Locke | 1–6 | 1–6–1 | 64 | 129 |

== Teams ==
=== Arkansas Tech ===
1946 Arkansas Tech Wonder Boys football

AIC champion
- Conference: Arkansas Intercollegiate Conference
- Record: 9–1 (6–0 AIC)
- Head coach: John Tucker (14th season)

The 1946 Arkansas Tech Wonder Boys football team represented Arkansas Tech University (sometimes referred to as "Arkansas Poly") as a member of the Arkansas Intercollegiate Conference (AIC) during the 1946 college football season. In their 14th year under head coach John Tucker, the Wonder Boys compiled a 9–1 record (6–0 against conference opponents), outscored all opponents by a total of 253 to 51, and won the AIC championship.

| Date | Opponent | Site | Result | Attendance | Source |
|---|---|---|---|---|---|
| September 20 | Central State (OK)* | Russellville, AR | W 7–0 | | |
| October 4 | at Ozarks | Clarksville, AR | W 53–0 | | |
| October 11 | Magnolia A&M | Russellvile, AR | W 39–6 | | |
| October 19 | Ouachita Baptist | Russellville, AR | W 20–12 | | |
| October 25 | at Arkansas junior varsity* | Fayetteville, AR | L 7–12 | | |
| November 2 | Western Union* | Russellville, AR | W 45–6 | | |
| November 9 | at Monticello A&M | Monticello, AR | W 29–0 | | |
| November 15 | at Henderson State | Arkadelphia, AR | W 14–7 | | |
| November 22 | Northeast Center* | Russellvile, AR | W 6–0 | | |
| November 28 | Hendrix | Russellville, AR | W 33–8 | | |
*Non-conference game

=== Ouachita Baptist ===
1946 Ouachita Baptist Tigers football
- Conference: Arkansas Intercollegiate Conference
- Record: 5–4 (5–1 AIC)
- Head coach: Robert Smith

The 1946 Ouachita Baptist Tigers football team represented Ouachita Baptist College as a member of the Arkansas Intercollegiate Conference (AIC) during the 1946 college football season. Led by head coach Robert Smith, the Tigers compiled a 5–4 record (5–1 against conference opponents), outscored all opponents by a total of 163 to 121, and placed second in the AIC

| Date | Opponent | Site | Result | Source |
|---|---|---|---|---|
| September 29 | Magnolia A&M | Arkadelphia, AR | W 27–0 | |
| October 4 | at Conway State | Conway, AR | W 6–0 | |
| October 19 | at Arkansas Tech | Russellville, AR | L 12–20 | |
| October 26 | Hendrix | Arkadelphia, AR | W 32–0 | |
| November 1 | at Northwestern State | Natchitoches, LA | L 14–47 | |
| | Arkansas JV | | L 7–13 | |
| November 16 | Arkansas-Monticello | Arkadelphia, AR | W 20–6 | |
| | Union (TN) | | L 19–21 | |
| | Henderson State | | W 26–14 | |

=== Henderson State ===
1946 Henderson State Reddies football
- Conference: Arkansas Intercollegiate Conference
- Record: 6–3–1 (4–2 AIC)
- Head coach: Duke Wells

The 1946 Henderson State Reddies football team represented Henderson State University as a member of the Arkansas Intercollegiate Conference (AIC) during the 1946 college football season. Led by head coach Duke Wells, the Reddies compiled a 6–3–1 record (4–2 against conference opponents), outscored opponents by a total of 142 to 131, and placed third in the AIC

| Date | Opponent | Site | Result | Source |
|---|---|---|---|---|
| September 20 | at Oklahoma City | Taft Stadium; Oklahoma City, OK | L 0–58 | |
| | Monticello A&M | | W 6–0 | |
| October 12 | at Hendrix | Conway, AR | W 20–0 | |
| | Conway State | | W 19–0 | |
| October 25 | East Central State (OK) | | W 19–12 | |
| November 2 | Ozarks | Arkadelphia, AR | W 33–0 | |
| November 9 | at Arkansas State | Jonesoboro, AR | T 0–0 | |
| | NE Oklahoma State | | W 24–21 | |
| | Ouachita Baptist | | L 14–26 | |

=== Magnolia A&M ===
1946 Magnolia A&M Aggies football
- Conference: Arkansas Intercollegiate Conference
- Record: 4–5 (3–2 AIC)
- Head coach: Elmer Smith (1st season)

The 1946 Magnolia A&M Aggies football team represented Magnolia A&M College (later renamed Southern Arkansas University) as a member of the Arkansas Intercollegiate Conference (AIC) during the 1946 college football season. Led by first-year head coach Elmer Smith, the Aggies compiled a 4–5 record (3–2 against conference opponents), were outscored by their opponents by a total of 158 to 98, and placed fourth in the AIC.

| Date | Opponent | Site | Result | Source |
|---|---|---|---|---|
| September 21 | at John McNeese Junior College* | Lake Charles, LA | L 0–20 | |
| September 28 | at Ouachita Baptist | Arkadelphia, AR | L 0–27 | |
| October 5 | Hendrix | Magnolia, AR | W 19–0 | |
| October 11 | at Arkansas Tech | Russellville, AR | L 6–39 | |
| October 18 | at East Oklahoma A&M* | Wilburton, OK | W 27–0 | |
| November 1 | Arkansas JV* | Magnolia, AR | L 7–45 | |
| November 8 | at Northeast Center* | Monroe, LA | L 0–19 | |
| November 16 | Ozarks | Magnolia, AR | W 18–7 | |
| November 29 | vs. Monticello A&M | El Dorado, AR | W 21–0 | |
*Non-conference game

=== Ozarks ===
1946 Ozarks Mountaineers football
- Conference: Arkansas Intercollegiate Conference
- Record: 2–7 (2–4 AIC)
- Head coach: Frank Koon

The 1946 Ozarks Mountaineers football team represented the College of the Ozarks as a member of the Arkansas Intercollegiate Conference (AIC) during the 1946 college football season. Led by head coach Frank Koon, the Mountaineers compiled a 2–7 record (2–4 against conference opponents), were outscored by a total of 250 to 44, and placed fifth in the AIC.

| Date | Opponent | Site | Result | Source |
|---|---|---|---|---|
| | Hendrix | | L 0–14 | |
| October 4 | Arkansas Tech | Clarksville, AR | L 0–53 | |
| | North East State | | L 0–20 | |
| October 11 | at East Central Oklahoma | Ada, OK | L 7–33 | |
| | Henderson State | | L 0–33 | |
| | Arkansas State Teachers | | W 7–6 | |
| | Magnolia A&M | | L 7–18 | |
| | Arkansas A&M | | W 20–19 | |
| | Arkansas "B" team | | L 3–54 | |

=== Arkansas State Teachers ===
1946 Arkansas State Teachers Bears football
- Conference: Arkansas Intercollegiate Conference
- Record: 2–6 (1–3 AIC)
- Head coach: Charles McGibbony

The 1946 Arkansas State Teachers Bears football team represented the Arkansas State Teachers College at Conway, Arkansas (now known as University of Central Arkansas) as a member of the Arkansas Intercollegiate Conference (AIC) during the 1946 college football season. Led by head coach Charles McGibbony, the Bears compiled a 2–6 record (1–3 against conference opponents), were outscored by a total of 139 to 57, and placed sixth in the AIC.

| Date | Opponent | Site | Result | Source |
|---|---|---|---|---|
| | Ouachita Baptist | | L 0–6 | |
| October 12 | Louisiana Tech | Tech Stadium; Ruston, LA | L 0–38 | |
| | Henderson State | | L 0–19 | |
| | Arkansas "B" team | | L 7–12 | |
| | Monticello | | W 13–0 | |
| | Ozarks | | L 6–7 | |
| November 28 | Arkansas State | Conway, AR | L 12–30 | |

=== Hendrix ===
1946 Hendrix Warriors football
- Conference: Arkansas Intercollegiate Conference
- Record: 1–8 (1–5 AIC)
- Head coach: Ivan Grove

The 1946 Hendrix Warriors football team represented Hendrix College of Conway, Arkansas, as a member of the Arkansas Intercollegiate Conference (AIC) during the 1946 college football season. Led by head coach Ivan Grove, the Warriors compiled a 1–8 record (1–5 against conference opponents), were outscored by a total of 230 to 36, and placed seventh in the AIC.

| Date | Opponent | Site | Result | Source |
|---|---|---|---|---|
| September 28 | Ozarks | Conway, AR | W 14–0 | |
| October 5 | at Magnolia A&M | Magnolia, AR | L 0–19 | |
| October 12 | Henderson State | Conway, AR | L 0–20 | |
| October 19 | at Arkansas A&M | Monticelo, AR | L 7–26 | |
| October 26 | at Ouachita Baptist | Arkdelphia, AR | L 0–32 | |
| November 2 | Sewanee | Conway, AR | L 0–25 | |
| November 9 | Southeast Missouri State | Cape Girardeau, MO | L 7–31 | |
| November 15 | Arkansas "B" team | Conway, AR | L 0–44 | |
| November 28 | Arkansas Tech | Russellville, AR | L 8–33 | |

=== Monticello A&M ===
1946 Monticello A&M Boll Weevils football
- Conference: Arkansas Intercollegiate Conference
- Record: 1–6–1 (1–6 AIC)
- Head coach: Doug Locke

The 1946 Monticello A&M Boll Weevils football team represented Arkansas A&M College at Monticello (now known as University of Arkansas at Monticello) as a member of the Arkansas Intercollegiate Conference (AIC) during the 1946 college football season. Led by head coach Doug Locke, the Boll Weevils compiled a 1–6–1 record (1–6 against conference opponents), were outscored by a total of 129 to 64, and placed last out of eight teams in the AIC.

| Date | Opponent | Site | Result | Source |
|---|---|---|---|---|
| | Henderson State | | L 0–6 | |
| October 12 | Arkansas State* | Monticello, AR | T 13–13 | |
| | Hendrix | | W 26–7 | |
| | Conway State | | L 0–13 | |
| November 9 | Arkansas Tech | Monticello, AR | L 0–29 | |
| | Ouachita Baptist | | L 6–20 | |
| | Ozarks | | L 19–20 | |
| | Magnolia A&M | | L 0–21 | |
*Non-conference game
