= Edgar O. Brown =

American sports coach and administrator (1880–1937)

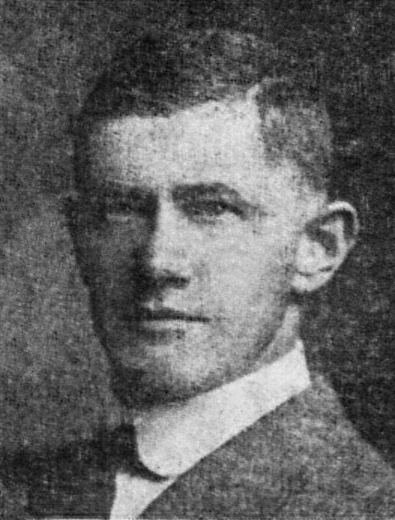
- Brown pictured in The Topeka Daily Capital, 1915

Biographical details
- Born: August 26, 1880; Sevierville, Tennessee, U.S.
- Died: March 11, 1937 (aged 56); Clarksville, Arkansas, U.S.

Playing career

Football
- 1907–1909: Wabash
- Position: Tackle

Coaching career (HC unless noted)

Football
- 1913: Parsons
- 1915–1916: Bethany (KS)
- 1917: Maryville (TN)
- 1919: Central (MO)
- 1920–1932: Arkansas Tech
- 1933: Ozarks (assistant)
- 1934–1935: Ozarks

Basketball
- 1920–1932: Arkansas Tech

Baseball
- 1923: Arkansas Tech

Administrative career (AD unless noted)
- 1930s: Ozarks

Head coaching record
- Overall: 108–46–17 (football); 63–54 (basketball); 1–4 (baseball)

Accomplishments and honors

Championships
- Football; 2 AIC (1928, 1931)

Edgar Osborne Brown (August 26, 1880 – March 11, 1937) was an American football, basketball and baseball coach and college athletics administrator. He coached at a number of colleges including Parsons College in Fairfield, Iowa, Bethany College in Lindsborg, Kansas, Maryville College in Maryville, Tennessee, Central College—now known as Central Methodist University—in Fayette, Missouri and Arkansas Polytechnic College—now known as Arkansas Tech University—in Russellville, Arkansas. In the 1930s, Brown was the athletic director at the College of the Ozarks—now known as the University of the Ozarks—in Clarksville, Arkansas.

== Playing career ==
Brown played college football at Wabash College in Crawfordsville, Indiana from 1907 to 1909. He also lettered in baseball, basketball, and track and field at Wabash. He set intercollegiate records for the state of Indiana in the shot put and discus throw.

== Coaching career ==
Brown was the head football coach at the Bethany College in Lindsborg, Kansas from 1915 to 1916, compiling a record of 3–11–1.

== Death ==
Brown died on March 11, 1937, in Clarksville, after suffering a paralytic stroke.

== Head coaching record ==
Year	Team	Overall	Conference	Standing	Bowl/playoffs
Parsons (Independent) (1913)
1913	Parsons	3–3–2			
Parsons:		3–3–2			
Bethany Swedes (Independent) (1915–1916)
1915	Bethany	1–6	1–6	14th	
1916	Bethany	2–6–1	2–5–1	T–12th	
Bethany:		3–12–1	3–11–1		
Maryville Scots (Independent) (1917)
1917	Maryville	7–3			
Maryville:		7–3			
Central Eagles (Missouri Intercollegiate Athletic Association) (1919)
1919	Central	4–3	3–2	4th	
Central:		4–3	3–2		
Arkansas Tech Wonder Boys (Independent) (1920–1927)
1920	Arkansas Tech	4–0–2			
1921	Arkansas Tech	7–0			
1922	Arkansas Tech	8–1			
1923	Arkansas Tech	6–1–1			
1924	Arkansas Tech	6–1–2			
1925	Arkansas Tech	7–2			
1926	Arkansas Tech	6–2			
1927	Arkansas Tech	5–3–1			
Arkansas Tech Wonder Boys (Arkansas Intercollegiate Conference) (1928–1932)
1928	Arkansas Tech	7–2		1st	
1929	Arkansas Tech	4–4–1			
1930	Arkansas Tech	5–2–2			
1931	Arkansas Tech	7–1–2		1st	
1932	Arkansas Tech	6–2–1			
Arkansas Tech:		78–21–12			
Ozarks Mountaineers (Independent) (1934–1935)
1934	Ozarks	7–2–1			
1935	Ozarks	6–2–1			
Ozarks:		13–4–2			
Total:		108–46–17			
National championship Conference title Conference division title or championship game berth
