= Roy Thompson Jr. =

American football coach (born c. 1984)

Current position
- Title: Head coach
- Team: Arkansas Tech
- Conference: GAC
- Record: 7–5

Biographical details
- Born: c. 1984 (age 41–42)
- Education: Belhaven College (2006, 2009)

Playing career
- 2002–2005: Belhaven
- Position: Defensive lineman

Coaching career (HC unless noted)
- 2006: Highland (KS) (DL)
- 2007–2008: Belhaven (LB/DL)
- 2009–2012: Ouachita Baptist (LB/DL)
- 2013: Belhaven (ST/DL)
- 2014–2015: Mendocino (AHC/DC/DB)
- 2016–2017: Ouachita Baptist (co-DC/LB)
- 2018–2024: Ouachita Baptist (DC/LB)
- 2025–present: Arkansas Tech

Head coaching record
- Overall: 7–5
- Bowls: 0–1

Roy Thompson Jr. (born c. 1984) is an American college football coach. He is the head football coach for Arkansas Tech University, a position he has held since 2025. He also coached for Highland (KS), Belhaven, Ouachita Baptist, and Mendocino. He played college football for Belhaven as a defensive lineman.

== Head coaching record ==
Year	Team	Overall	Conference	Standing	Bowl/playoffs
Arkansas Tech Wonder Boys (Great American Conference) (2025–present)
2025	Arkansas Tech	7–5	7–4	T–4th	L Heritage
2026	Arkansas Tech	0–0	0–0		
Arkansas Tech:		7–5	7–4		
Total:		7–5			
