= Frank Koon =

American athletics coach and administrator (1908–1987)

Biographical details
- Born: December 31, 1908
- Died: January 9, 1987 (aged 78); Conway, Arkansas, U.S.

Playing career

Football
- 1929–1932: Henderson State

Coaching career (HC unless noted)

Football
- 1933–1941: Sheridan HS (AR)
- 1946–1954: Ozarks
- 1955–1964: Arkansas State Teachers

Basketball
- 1947–1955: Ozarks

Administrative career (AD unless noted)
- 1955–1965: Arkansas State Teachers

Head coaching record
- Overall: 88–81–7 (college football); 65–103 (college basketball); 49–24–2 (high school football)

Accomplishments and honors

Championships
- Football; 2 AIC (1959, 1962) Basketball; 1 AIC regular season (1949)

James Frank Koon (December 31, 1908 – January 9, 1987) was an American football and basketball coach and college athletics administrator. He served as the head football coach at the College of the Ozarks—now known as the University of the Ozarks—in Clarksville, Arkansas from 1946 to 1954 and Arkansas State Teachers College—now known as University of Central Arkansas—in Conway, Arkansas from 1955 to 1964. Koon was also the head basketball coach at Ozarks from 1947 to 1955.

Koon died on January 9, 1987, in Conway.

== Head coaching record ==
=== College football ===
| Year | Team | Overall | Conference | Standing | Bowl/playoffs | NAIA^{#} |
|---|---|---|---|---|---|---|
Ozarks Mountaineers (Arkansas Intercollegiate Conference) (1946–1954)
| 1946 | Ozarks | 2–7 | 2–4 | 5th | | |
| 1947 | Ozarks | 3–6–1 | | | | |
| 1948 | Ozarks | 4–7 | | | | |
| 1949 | Ozarks | 3–6 | | | | |
| 1950 | Ozarks | 3–8 | | | | |
| 1951 | Ozarks | 5–3–1 | | | | |
| 1952 | Ozarks | 5–2–1 | 2–2–1 | T–3rd | | |
| 1953 | Ozarks | 5–2–1 | | | | |
| 1954 | Ozarks | 5–3 | | | | |
| Ozarks: | | 35–44–4 | | | | |
Arkansas State Teachers Bears (Arkansas Intercollegiate Conference) (1955–1964)
| 1955 | Arkansas State Teachers | 1–7–1 | | | | |
| 1956 | Arkansas State Teachers | 0–10 | | | | |
| 1957 | Arkansas State Teachers | 3–6 | | | | |
| 1958 | Arkansas State Teachers | 7–2 | 4–1 | 3rd | | |
| 1959 | Arkansas State Teachers | 8–0–1 | 5–0–1 | T–1st | | 20 |
| 1960 | Arkansas State Teachers | 8–1 | 6–1 | 2nd | | |
| 1961 | Arkansas State Teachers | 7–3 | 5–2 | T–2nd | | |
| 1962 | Arkansas State Teachers | 8–2 | 7–0 | 1st | | |
| 1963 | Arkansas State Teachers | 6–2–1 | 5–1–1 | 3rd | | |
| 1964 | Arkansas State Teachers | 5–4 | 4–3 | T–3rd | | |
| Arkansas State Teachers: | | 53–37–3 | | | | |
| Total: | | 88–81–7 | | | | |
National championship Conference title Conference division title or championship game berth
^{#}Rankings from final NAIA Poll.
