= John Tucker (American football) =

American football player and coach (1901–1983)

Biographical details
- Born: April 15, 1901; Russellville, Arkansas, U.S.
- Died: February 20, 1983 (aged 81); Russellville, Arkansas, U.S.

Playing career
- 1919–1924: Arkansas Tech
- 1930–1931: Alabama
- Position: Quarterback

Coaching career (HC unless noted)
- 1933–1947: Arkansas Tech

Head coaching record
- Overall: 77–17–9

Accomplishments and honors

Championships
- As coach: 5 AIC (1935, 1939, 1945–1947); As player: National (1930)

John E. Tucker (April 15, 1901 – February 20, 1983) was an American football player and coach. He served as the head coach at Arkansas Tech University from 1933 to 1947, compiling a record of 77–17–9. He played football at Arkansas Tech and later at the University of Alabama in 1930 and 1931.

== Arkansas Tech ==
Tucker is ultimately responsible for the idiosyncratic nickname "Wonder Boys" for Arkansas Tech University. On November 15, 1919, Tucker, as a 17-year-old freshman, scored two touchdowns and kicked two extra points to lead the Second District Agricultural School Aggies to a 14–0 upset win over Jonesboro. In newspaper accounts following the game, Tucker and his teammates were referred to as "Wonder Boys," and the nickname remains to this day. Tucker was labeled as "The Original Wonder Boy" and was associated with the school for the rest of his life. He went on to play on the University of Alabama's Rose Bowl team in 1931 and served Arkansas Tech in a variety of roles - including coach, athletic director and chemistry professor - between 1925 and 1972. Two buildings on the Tech campus - Tucker Coliseum and Tucker Hall - are named in his honor.

== Alabama ==
Tucker played for Wallace Wade's Alabama Crimson Tide football teams of 1930 and 1931, winning a national championship in 1930.

== Head coaching record ==
Year	Team	Overall	Conference	Standing	Bowl/playoffs
Arkansas Tech Wonder Boys (Arkansas Intercollegiate Conference) (1933–1947)
1933	Arkansas Tech	3–3–1	2–3–1	6th	
1934	Arkansas Tech	5–1–2	4–1–2	2nd	
1935	Arkansas Tech	8–0–1	6–0–1	1st	
1936	Arkansas Tech	6–2	5–1	2nd	
1937	Arkansas Tech	8–1	3–1	2nd	
1938	Arkansas Tech	4–2–2	2–2	3rd	
1939	Arkansas Tech	7–0–2	2–0–2	1st	
1940	Arkansas Tech	5–3–1	1–2–1	3rd	
1941	Arkansas Tech	6–3	3–3	2nd	
1942	No team—World War II				
1943	No team—World War II				
1944	No team—World War II				
1945	Arkansas Tech	8–0	6–0	1st	
1946	Arkansas Tech	9–1	6–0	1st	
1947	Arkansas Tech	8–1	6–0	1st	
Arkansas Tech:		77–17–9	46–13–7		
Total:		77–17–9			
National championship Conference title Conference division title or championship game berth
