= Elmer Smith (American football) =

American football and basketball player and coach

Biographical details
- Born: September 15, 1907; Casa, Arkansas, U.S.
- Died: 1987

Playing career

Football
- 1927–1930: Hendrix

Basketball
- 1927–1931: Hendrix

Baseball
- c. 1930: Hendrix
- 1931: New Orleans Pelicans
- Positions: Fullback (football); Catcher (baseball)

Coaching career (HC unless noted)

Football
- 1931–1932: Hamburg HS (AR)
- 1933–1935: Hendrix (assistant)
- 1936–1941: Centenary (backfield)
- 1946–1953: Magnolia A&M / Southern State
- 1954–1971: Texas A&M (assistant)

Basketball
- 1939–1942: Centenary

Head coaching record
- Overall: 54–27–2 (college football); 18–2 (high school football)
- Bowls: 1–0–1

Accomplishments and honors

Championships
- Football; 3 AIC (1948, 1951–1952)

Elmer Smith (September 15, 1907 – 1987) was an American football, basketball, and baseball player and coach. Smith served as the head basketball coach Centenary College in Shreveport, Louisiana from 1939 to 1942 before taking on the head football coaching duties at Southern Arkansas University in Magnolia, Arkansas from 1946 to 1953. After leaving Southern Arkansas, he was an assistant football coach at Texas A&M University under coaches Bear Bryant, Jim Myers, Hank Foldberg, and Gene Stallings.

Smith was born on September 15, 1907, in Casa, Arkansas, and graduated from Danville High School in Danville, Arkansas. He was a multi-sport athlete at Hendrix College in Conway, Arkansas, lettering in football, basketball, baseball, and track and field, before graduating in 1931 with a bachelor's degree in economics. He earned a master's degree in physical education from Peabody College. Smith began his coaching career in 1931 at Hamburg High School in Hamburg, Arkansas, where he led the football team in a record of 18–2 in two seasons. He then returned to Hendrix as an assistant coach. Smith was hired at Centenary as an assistant coach in 1936, succeeding Elza Renfro. He remained at Centenary until 1942, when joined the United States Navy, reaching the rank of lieutenant commander.

== Head coaching record ==
=== College football ===
Year	Team	Overall	Conference	Standing	Bowl/playoffs
Magnolia A&M Aggies / Southern State Muleriders (Arkansas Intercollegiate Conference) (1946–1953)
1946	Magnolia A&M	4–5	3–2	4th	
1947	Magnolia A&M	9–2–1	4–2		T Cajun Bowl
1948	Magnolia A&M	8–2	6–1	T–1st	W Papoose Bowl
1949	Magnolia A&M	3–7	1–6		
1950	Magnolia A&M	6–4–1	3–2–1		
1951	Southern State	9–1	6–0	1st	
1952	Southern State	10–1	5–0	1st	
1953	Southern State	5–5	2–4		
Magnolia A&M / Southern State:		54–27–2	30–17–1		
Total:		54–27–2			
National championship Conference title Conference division title or championship game berth
