= 1961 Arkansas Tech Wonder Boys football team =

American college football season

1961 Arkansas Tech Wonderboys football

AIC champion
- Conference: Arkansas Intercollegiate Conference
- Record: 8–0–1 (6–0–1 AIC)
- Head coach: Marvin Salmon (3rd season)

1961 Arkansas Intercollegiate Conference football standings
	Conf.					Overall
Team	W		L		T	W		L		T
No. 17 Arkansas Tech $	6	–	0	–	1	8	–	0	–	1
Arkansas State Teachers	5	–	2	–	0	7	–	3	–	0
Southern State (AR)	5	–	2	–	0	6	–	3	–	0
Harding	4	–	3	–	0	4	–	5	–	0
Henderson State	3	–	3	–	0	4	–	6	–	0
Ouachita Baptist	2	–	3	–	1	4	–	4	–	1
Arkansas A&M	1	–	6	–	0	2	–	8	–	0
Ozarks	0	–	7	–	0	0	–	8	–	0
$ – Conference champion; Rankings from NAIA poll

The 1961 Arkansas Tech Wonder Boys football team was an American football team that represented Arkansas Tech University of Russellville, Arkansas, as a member of the Arkansas Intercollegiate Conference (AIC) during the 1961 college football season. In their third season under head coach Marvin Salmon, the Wonder Boys compiled an 8–0–1 record (6–0–1 in AIC games), won the AIC championship, and outscored opponents by a total of 256 to 49. It was the program's second consecutive AIC championship.

End Powell McClellan received first-team honors on the 1961 Little All-America college football team. Halfback Bill Curtis led the AIC in rushing.

== Schedule ==
Date	Opponent	Site	Result	Attendance	Source
September 16	at Northeastern State	Tahlequah, OK	W 12–0		
September 23	Harding	Russellville, AR	W 31–0		
September 30	Arkansas A&M	Russellville, AR	W 39–7		
October 7	at Southern State (AR)	Magnolia, AR	W 6–2		
October 21	Central Arkansas*	Russellville, AR	W 16–7		
October 28	Southeastern Oklahoma State	Russellville, AR	W 49–20		
November 3	at Henderson State	Arkadelphia, AR	W 30–0		
November 11	Ouachita Baptist^{†}	Russellville, AR	T 6–6		
November 18	at Ozarks	Clarksville, AR	W 67–7		
*Non-conference game; ^{†}Homecoming
