= 2009 NCAA Division II Football Championship Game =

2009 NCAA Division II Football Championship
Grand Valley State Lakers	Northwest Missouri State Bearcats
(13–1)	(13–1)
23	30
Head coach: Chuck Martin	Head coach: Mel Tjeerdsma
	1	2	3	4	Total
Grand Valley State	0	0	13	10	23
Northwest Missouri State	7	14	2	7	30
- Date: December 12, 2009
- Stadium: Braly Municipal Stadium
- Location: Florence, Alabama

United States TV coverage
- Network: ESPN2

The 2009 NCAA Division II Football Championship Game was held on December 12, 2009 at Braly Municipal Stadium near the campus of the University of North Alabama in Florence, Alabama.

== Playoffs ==
The 2009 NCAA Division II National Football Championship playoffs involved 24 schools playing in a single-elimination tournament to determine the national champion of NCAA Division II college football.

The tournament began on November 14, 2009, and concluded on December 12, 2009 at Braly Municipal Stadium near the campus of the University of North Alabama in Florence, Alabama.

== Game Summary ==
The championship game matched the Northwest Missouri State Bearcats against the Grand Valley State Lakers. The Bearcats jumped out to an early lead, going up 21-0 by halftime. The Lakers recovered, getting within three points (23-20) early in the fourth quarter. However, the Bearcats stayed ahead and won the game by the final score of 30-23. The win completed NW Missouri St's third Division II football title.
