= Kyle Shipp =

American football coach (born 1984)

Biographical details
- Born: September 28, 1984 (age 42); Morrilton, Arkansas, U.S.
- Education: Arkansas Tech University (2007, 2009)

Playing career
- 2003–2005: Arkansas Tech
- Position: Wide receiver

Coaching career (HC unless noted)
- 2006: Arkansas Tech (SA)
- 2007–2008: Arkansas Tech (GA)
- 2009–2010: Arkansas State (GA)
- 2011–2013: Arkansas Tech (WR)
- 2014–2015: Arkansas–Monticello (OC/QB)
- 2016–2018: Arkansas–Monticello (AHC/OC)
- 2019–2024: Arkansas Tech

Head coaching record
- Overall: 19–30

Kyle Shipp (born September 28, 1984) is an American college football coach. He was the head football coach for Arkansas Tech University from 2019 to 2024. He previously coached for Arkansas State and Arkansas–Monticello. He played college football for Arkansas Tech as a wide receiver. He is married to Krystal Carr Shipp. They have two children.

== Head coaching record ==
Year	Team	Overall	Conference	Standing	Bowl/playoffs
Arkansas Tech Wonder Boys (Great American Conference) (2019–2024)
2019	Arkansas Tech	3–8	3–8	T–8th	
2020–21	No team—COVID-19				
2021	Arkansas Tech	4–7	4–7	T–8th	
2022	Arkansas Tech	5–6	5–6	T–6th	
2023	Arkansas Tech	5–6	5–6	T–7th	
2024	Arkansas Tech	5–6	5–6	T–5th	
Arkansas Tech:		19–30	19–30		
Total:		19–30			
