= Sam Hindsman =

American sports coach (1917–1997)

Biographical details
- Born: October 31, 1917; Itta Bena, Mississippi, U.S.
- Died: June 16, 1997 (aged 79)

Playing career

Football
- 1939–1940: West Tennessee

Basketball
- 1939–1941: West Tennessee

Coaching career (HC unless noted)

Football
- 1941: Dermott HS (AR)
- 1944: North Little Rock HS (AR) (assistant)
- 1945–1946: Arkansas State Teachers (assistant)
- 1954–1958: Arkansas Tech

Basketball
- 1944–1945: Arkansas State Teachers
- 1946–1947: Arkansas State Teachers
- 1947–1966: Arkansas Tech

Baseball
- 1953–1956: Arkansas Tech

Head coaching record
- Overall: 31–16–2 (college football); 384–159 (college basketball); 24–16 (college baseball)

Samuel Felix Hindsman Jr. (October 31, 1917 – June 16, 1997) was an American football, basketball, and baseball coach. He was a standout athlete at West Tennessee State Teachers College—now known as the University of Memphis—from 1939 to 1941. After coaching at a pair of Arkansas high schools, Hindsman served as the head basketball coach at the University of Central Arkansas in Conway, Arkansas from 1944 to 1945 and again from 1946 to 1947. He moved to Russellville, Arkansas, where he served as the head basketball coach at Arkansas Tech University from 1947 to 1966. Hindsman also served as the head baseball coach (1953 to 1956) and head football coach (1954 to 1958) at Arkansas Tech.
