= North Alabama Lions football =

American college football team

2026 North Alabama Lions football team
- First season: 1912; 114 years ago (Note: The first fielded team played from 1912 to 1928, then was discontinued. The program was relaunched in the 1949 season; 77 years ago.)
- Athletic director: Josh Looney
- Head coach: Brent Dearmon; 4th season, 8–27 (.229)
- Location: Florence, Alabama
- Stadium: Bobby Wallace Field at Bank Independent Stadium (capacity: 10,000)
- NCAA division: Division I FCS
- Conference: UAC
- Colors: Purple and gold
- All-time record: 488–325–16 (.598)
- Playoff record: 35–18 (.660)

NCAA Division II championships
- 1993, 1994, 1995

Conference championships
- GSC: 1980, 1983, 1985, 1993, 1994, 1995, 2003, 2006, 2009, 2013, 2014, 2015, 2016
- Consensus All-Americans: 63
- Rivalries: West Alabama (rivalry)
- Fight song: Go! Fight! U-N-A!
- Mascot: Leo and Una
- Marching band: Marching Pride of North Alabama
- Outfitter: Adidas
- Website: roarlions.com

The North Alabama Lions football program represents the University of North Alabama (UNA) in college football as the NCAA Division I Football Championship Subdivision (FCS) level as a member of the United Athletic Conference (UAC). The current UAC is a rebranding of the conference that operated as the Western Athletic Conference (WAC) from its formation in 1962 through the 2025–26 school year. The all-sports UAC absorbed a football-only UAC that played from 2023–2025 as a merger of the football leagues of UNA's previous primary home of the Atlantic Sun Conference (ASUN) and the WAC. UNA had played the 2022 season in the ASUN, and before that had played football in the Big South Conference for three seasons. After the 2025–26 school year, the WAC rebranded as the UAC, with the initial membership of the all-sports UAC consisting of UNA, four other football-sponsoring schools from the ASUN (Austin Peay, Central Arkansas, Eastern Kentucky, and West Georgia), three schools from the WAC (Abilene Christian, Tarleton State, and non-football UT Arlington), and non-football Little Rock from the Ohio Valley Conference. The all-sports UAC later added Division II upgrader West Florida as a football-only affiliate starting in the 2026 season.

UNA plays its home games at Bobby Wallace Field at Bank Independent Stadium in Florence, Alabama. The team's head coach is Brent Dearmon. UNA was an NCAA Division II member from 1972 to 2017.

The Lions are distinguished as the only team to win three consecutive football national championships in NCAA Division II. UNA's 27 consecutive weeks at No. 1 in the Division II polls also comprise the longest stretch of consecutive No. 1 rankings in football in NCAA history on any level. UNA was the last Division II team to beat a Division I-A (FBS) team, defeating Southwestern Louisiana (now Louisiana) on October 11, 1997. In 2016, UNA won their fourth consecutive Gulf South Conference championship — a conference record.

== History ==
Since the rebirth of football at the University of North Alabama in 1949, UNA has been one of the most consistently successful programs in the state of Alabama and on a regional and national level.

As an NCAA Division II member, UNA was nationally ranked in the Top 25 of the final Division II poll 21 times from 1980 to 2017, with 15 Top Ten Rankings. UNA's 21 all-time playoff appearances are the second most in Division II history. In addition, UNA's 35 playoff wins are the second most in DII history and the Lions' 12 Gulf South Conference football crowns are by far the most in league history.

In 2018, the Lions began a new chapter with a transition to Division I and Football Championship Subdivision (FCS) status. The Lions played as an independent in the FCS in 2018 and finished with a 7–3 record. In 2019, UNA played its first season as a member of the Big South Conference and went 4–7 overall, losing three games by a touchdown or less. The Lions were not eligible to rank in the conference standings due to the transition but would have finished fourth with a 3–4 league mark. During the season, the Lions faced four nationally ranked FCS teams, all on the road.

The University of North Alabama fielded football teams from 1912 to 1928, but with little or no success.

Following a miserable showing in 1928, football was dropped at the university. For the next 21 years there were several efforts made to return football to the Florence campus by writing letters to the administration and gathering names on petitions. Those efforts finally proved successful on March 30, 1949, when President Dr. E.B. Norton held a student assembly to announce that football would return to campus that September.

Since that September day, the university has reaped 67 years worth of benefits from a football program that has helped put UNA on the map as one of the nation's premier collegiate powers. As an example, North Alabama boasts the highest winningest percentage since 1990 of any collegiate football program from the football tradition rich state of Alabama at 72.29.

UNA's football success has come through the combined efforts of eight different head coaches, more than 80 assistant coaches and more than 1,200 student-athletes.

Since Hal Self guided the first Lion squad onto the field on Sept. 29, 1949, through UNA's playoff loss that ended the 2009 season, the North Alabama program has made a name for itself like few others in the nation.

The 2008 season, UNA's 60th since football returned to campus, was emblematic of the Lions’ current position in college football. The Lions posted a 12–2 record and came within one game of playing for the Division II National Championship on its home field. That's because UNA had served as the host for the Division II Football Championship since 1986, and is the only school to have had the chance to claim a Division II title on its home field. Following a record-setting season of his own, North Alabama quarterback A.J. Milwee was the runner-up for the Division II National Player of the Year Award. That award is the Harlon Hill Trophy, named for the former Lion standout end whose name has been on the player of the year award since its creation in 1986.

Then in 2009, another historic chapter was written when nationally renowned coach Terry Bowden came to Florence and led the Lions to an 11–2 record, a Gulf South Conference championship, a spot in the quarterfinals of the Division II playoffs and a No. 6 national ranking in the final poll. It was UNA's fifth straight season with 10 or more wins and fifth straight playoff appearance. It was UNA's 15th overall playoff appearance and the Lions' 27 NCAA playoff wins are also the second most by any current Division II institution. North Alabama's Michael Johnson was named National Defensive Player of the Year by Daktronics and D2Football.com, lineman Montrell Craft was a national finalist for the Gene Upshaw Award as Division II's top lineman and quarterback Harrison Beck was a national finalist for the Harlon Hill Trophy as Division II Player of the Year.

In 2010 the Lions made their sixth consecutive NCAA playoff appearance and finished with a 9–4 record and followed that with a seventh straight post-season appearance in 2011.

In 2013 the Lions made their ninth post-season appearance in the last 11 years and reached the quarterfinals of the Division II playoffs and followed that with a 9–2 record and 19th NCAA post-season appearance in 2014 and a 9–3 record and 20th playoff trip in 2015. In 2016, North Alabama won an unprecedented fourth straight Gulf South Conference Championship, advanced to the Division II Playoffs for the 21st time and advanced to the Division II National Championship Game for the fifth time in school history.

But the Lions can trace their success much further back. The first 30 years after the rebirth of the Lion football program established a strong foundation for the program. Under the direction of Hal Self, the early Lion football teams were a model of consistency, enjoying 12 winning seasons in the first 14 years or the program. The Lions dominated other state institutions, going 12 years from 1952 to 1964 without losing a game to another school from Alabama (31–0–2). The Lions’ first conference title came in 1960 with the formation of the Alabama Collegiate Conference, and UNA would win four straight league titles. The first African American football players also joined the program during the Self era.

Upon Self's retirement from coaching in 1969, Durell Mock became the first, and so far only, former Lion player to become the Lions’ head football coach. During Mock's third and final season as head coach, the university became a charter member of the Gulf South Conference. Three years later Mickey Andrews came to Florence and stayed four years before giving way to Wayne Grubb as the school's fourth head coach.

Grubb would lead UNA to 84 wins, three Gulf South Conference titles and its first three NCAA playoff appearances in an 11-year stint in Florence.

Following Grubb's departure, UNA turned to Bobby Wallace to continue the Lion tradition and he was more than up for the challenge. In his 10 years in Florence, Wallace led UNA to 82 wins, three GSC titles, six playoff appearances and three NCAA Division II National Championships in 1993, 1994 and 1995.

North Alabama became the first school in the history of NCAA scholarship football to win three consecutive national championships, and UNA is still the only NCAA Division II institution to have won three straight crowns. Following that 1995 season, the Lions also became the first Division II squad invited to the White House, as the UNA squad met with President Bill Clinton, Vice President Al Gore and members of Congress.

From 1993 to 1995 the Lions went 41–1 and set a Division II record by ranking No. 1 in the nation in 27 straight polls, UNA also tied a Division II record by winning 28 consecutive home games at Braly Stadium.

Wallace left UNA following another playoff run in 1997 and the Lions elevated longtime defensive coordinator Bill Hyde to the head coaching position. Hyde retired following the 2001 season and Mark Hudspeth became the seventh head coach in UNA history.

Hudspeth spent seven seasons in Florence and put the Lion program back at the top of Division II, winning 64 games and making five playoff appearances. Under Hudspeth's direction, the Lions reached the NCAA semifinals three times, the quarterfinals twice, and had five seasons with 10 or more wins.

With six decades of success already on the books, even more excitement was brought to the Lion football program on December 31, 2008, with the hiring of Terry Bowden as UNA's eighth head football coach.

Bringing a Division I National Coach of the Year to Florence sparked anticipation for year number 61 of Lion football and Bowden's first team didn't disappoint. UNA went 11–2 and won the Gulf South Conference championship. In three years in Florence Bowden compiled a 29–10 record with three NCAA playoff appearances.

Bobby Wallace returned to UNA prior to the 2012 season and led the Lions to a 5–5 record before his 2013 squad went 10–3, won a share of the GSC Championship and fought its way to the quarterfinals of the NCAA Division II Playoffs. Wallace and the Lions followed that with a 9–2 record, co-GSC Championship and another NCAA Playoff bid in 2014, a 9–3 record, third straight GSC title and NCAA Playoff appearance in 2015 and an unprecedented fourth straight GSC title, an 11–2 record and a trip to the Division II National Championship Game in 2016. Wallace retired at the conclusion of the season as the winningest coach in UNA history with a 126–51–1 record and as the winningest coach in Gulf South Conference history at 152–81–1.

After 15 seasons as an assistant coach on the UNA staff, Chris Willis became the Lions tenth head coach in 2017, leading the Lions in their final season of Division II competition as well as into the transition as an FCS program. Wilis led the Lions to a solid 7–3 finish in their first season in the FCS in 2018.

Despite a solid debut on the FCS level, the Lions only won 4 games during the 2019 season. The 2020 season saw the Lions play only 4 games in the whole season due to the COVID-19 pandemic. 3 of which were away games against FBS programs. The season saw them face 2 nationally ranked teams: the 25th place ranked Liberty and the 8th place ranked BYU. The short season saw the Lions' first ever winless season. 2021 saw a return to normalcy as UNA returned to play a full season. The season saw a slight improvement in the win column as they finished with a 3–8 record.

2022 was the first year of North Alabama's full membership in Division I and FCS. The Lions were now eligible for conference titles and post-season competition, a benefit that they would not see in 2022. After starting the season with a 1–7 record, North Alabama parted ways with head coach Chris Willis. The Lions would finish the last 3 games of the year under the leadership of interim head coach Ryan Held.

Former Bethel head coach Brent Dearmon was hired to coach the team for the 2023 season. The season would kick off with a neutral site game against Mercer at the Cramton Bowl in Montgomery, Alabama. The Week Zero matchup would be the Lions first time on an ESPN network since 2016 and their first time on ESPN proper since 1995. Despite losing to Mercer 17–7 on national television, North Alabama would come into the public consciousness again at the end of the season. For the last game of the season, the Lions would travel to Tallahassee, Florida to take on the #4 team in the country, Florida State. The game, which was televised nationally on The CW, took the college football world by shock. Despite a 3–7 record in the FCS level, the Lions took an early 13–0 lead over the Seminoles. Florida State would come back from the deficit and beat the Lions 58–13. The game saw Takairee Kenebrew break Dre Hall's record for most receiving touchdowns in a career at UNA. The game also saw Florida State QB Jordan Travis get injured in the 1st half. The resulting leg injury would result in the end of the potential Heisman candidate's season and collegiate career. The loss of Travis is what many accredit as the main cause for the Seminoles being left out of the College Football Playoff despite being undefeated and being snubbed for Alabama. The injury and the exclusion from the playoffs led many to think of the North Alabama game and its impact on the FSU season.

During the 2024 season, the Lions made program history. During Homecoming weekend, they defeated the #10-ranked Abilene Christian Wildcats. This victory marked the program's first victory over a ranked Division I team and the first time the program had won three straight conference games since 2016.

With the team successes have come a remarkable amount of individual accolades. Since 1949, 63 different Lion players have earned first or second-team All-American honors. Wallace was selected as the Division II Coach of the Quarter Century and the 1995 UNA squad was chosen as Division II's Best Team of the Quarter Century (1972–97).

Two Lion players, linebacker Ronald McKinnon (1995) and quarterback Will Hall (2003) won the Harlon Hill Trophy. Center Lance Ancar won the Division II Rimington Trophy as the division's top center in 2005.

McKinnon and quarterback Cody Gross have been inducted into the Division II Football Hall of Fame and McKinnon received the ultimate honor when he was enshrined into the College Football Hall of Fame in 2008. Wallace was also inducted as part of the first class of coaches to enter the Division II Football Hall of Fame in 2010.

On a professional level, the Lions have produced an NFL Rookie of the Year and Most Valuable Player in Harlon Hill, and five other Lions have played on Super Bowl squads. A total of 24 Lions have been drafted by professional teams and 35 more have signed free agent NFL contracts. Numerous others have played in a variety of professional leagues in the United States, Canada and Europe.

== Rivalries ==
=== West Alabama ===
UNA and the University of West Alabama (UWA) first played in 1949 and played every year through 2017. UNA leads the series 52–18–1. UWA won the first two meetings in 1949 (14–13) and 1950 (19–0), but UNA followed that with a thirteen-game winning streak (1951–1963). The longest winning streak in the series is held by UNA at fourteen games (1988–2001). The current winning streak is held by UWA at one game. The most recent match-up was played on September 23, 2017, resulting in a 38–17 victory for UWA. The 2017 meeting was likely the last for the foreseeable future since UNA has moved to the FCS.

== Head coaches ==
- Records are through the end of the 2024 season

Tenure	Coach	Years	Record	Percentage
1949–1969	Hal Self	21	109–81–8	.571
1970–1972	Durell Mock	3	8–24–0	.250
1973–1976	Mickey Andrews	4	18–21–1	.462
1977–1987	Wayne Grubb	11	84–43–6	.707
1988–1997	Bobby Wallace	10	82–36–1	.693
1998–2001	Bill Hyde	4	20–21	.487
2002–2008	Mark Hudspeth	7	66–21	.758
2009–2011	Terry Bowden	3	29–9	.763
2012–2016	Bobby Wallace	5	44–15	.746
2017–2022	Chris Willis	6	20–34	.370
2022	Ryan Held	1	0–3	.000
2023–present	Brent Dearmon	3	8–27	.229
Totals	12 coaches	77 seasons	488–325–16	.598

=== Hal Self ===
Under the direction of head coach Hal Self, the college completed 1949 with a 4–5 record, turning in a slightly improved 5–4 record the following year. However, during Self's 21 seasons as head coach, the Lions compiled a 109–81–8 record, even posting wins against some Division I schools.

The Lions were especially dominant among other Alabama teams, building a 31–0–2 record, beginning with a 32–6 win over Livingston (now West Alabama) in 1952 and ending 12 years later with a 21–7 loss to Troy State in 1964. Self also amassed several Alabama Collegiate Conference championships and coached eight All-Americans, including Harlon Hill, the school's first professional football star.

Former Lion standout Durell Mock succeeded Self in 1970, followed by Mickey Andrews in 1973.

=== Wayne Grubb ===
Wayne Grubb took over for Andrews in 1977. Grubb followed a disappointing 5–5 beginning season with 8 consecutive winning seasons, including Gulf South Conference championships in 1980, 1983, and 1985. UNA also qualified for the national semifinals in 1980 and 1983, competing for the Division II Championship at Palm Bowl in McAllen, Texas, in 1985.

In 1985, Florence's Braly Municipal Stadium also was secured as the site of the Division II national championship game, with UNA serving as the host institution until 2013, when it was announced that the championship would move to Kansas City, Missouri in 2014 and remain there through 2017. The Division II move to Florence also led to the adoption of the Harlon Hill Trophy, named after one of the most successful athletes in UNA's history.

=== Bobby Wallace (first stint) ===
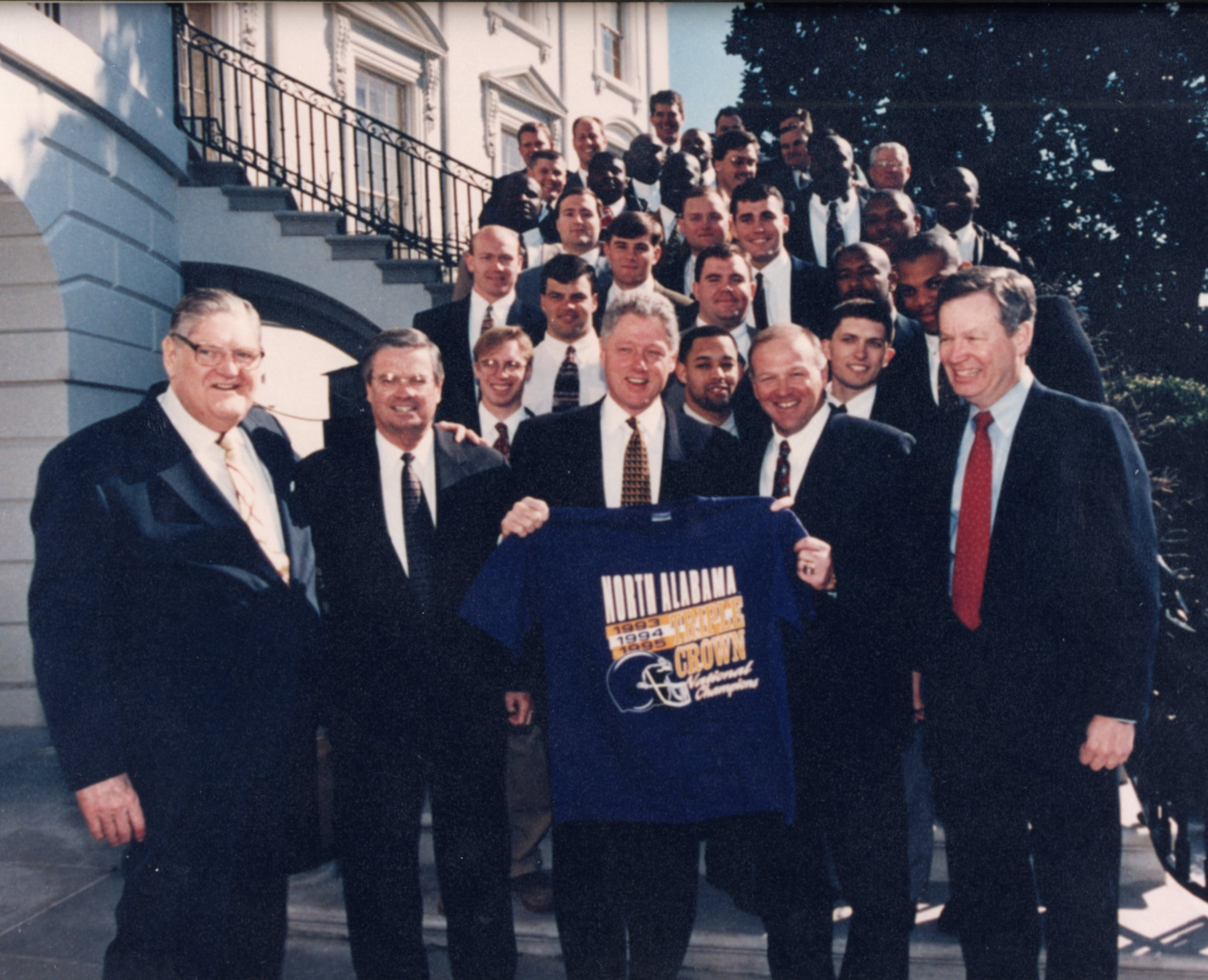
Coach Bobby Wallace, UNA President Robert Potts, and members of the 1995 National Championship team pose with President Bill Clinton and U.S. Senator Howell Heflin at the White House.

The most successful era in UNA football history followed the hiring of Bobby Wallace as head football coach. Following a four-year rebuilding period, Wallace led the Lions to a 7–4–1 record in 1992 and competed in the second round of the Division II championship until losing to Jacksonville State, the eventual Division II national champions.

Over the next three years from 1993 to 1995, UNA amassed a 41–1 record, which also encompassed three straight Gulf South Conference Championships and three consecutive NCAA Division II National Championships—the first three-peat in NCAA history. UNA also became the first program to achieve 40 wins in three seasons.

The only loss UNA suffered during this three-year period was to Youngstown State, a Division I-AA power at the time, losing narrowly, 17–14, following a field goal in the fourth quarter. Youngstown State went on to win the 1994 I-AA national championship.

During Wallace's 10-year tenure, the UNA Lions competed in six NCAA playoffs and compiled an 82–36–1 record.

In 1995, UNA Lions were selected the “Best Team of the Quarter Century” in Division II, while Wallace was named Division II's "Coach of the Quarter Century."

Following their third consecutive NCAA Division II Football Championship in 1995, the Lions were invited to the White House to meet President Bill Clinton, Vice President Al Gore, and members of Congress.

=== Mark Hudspeth ===
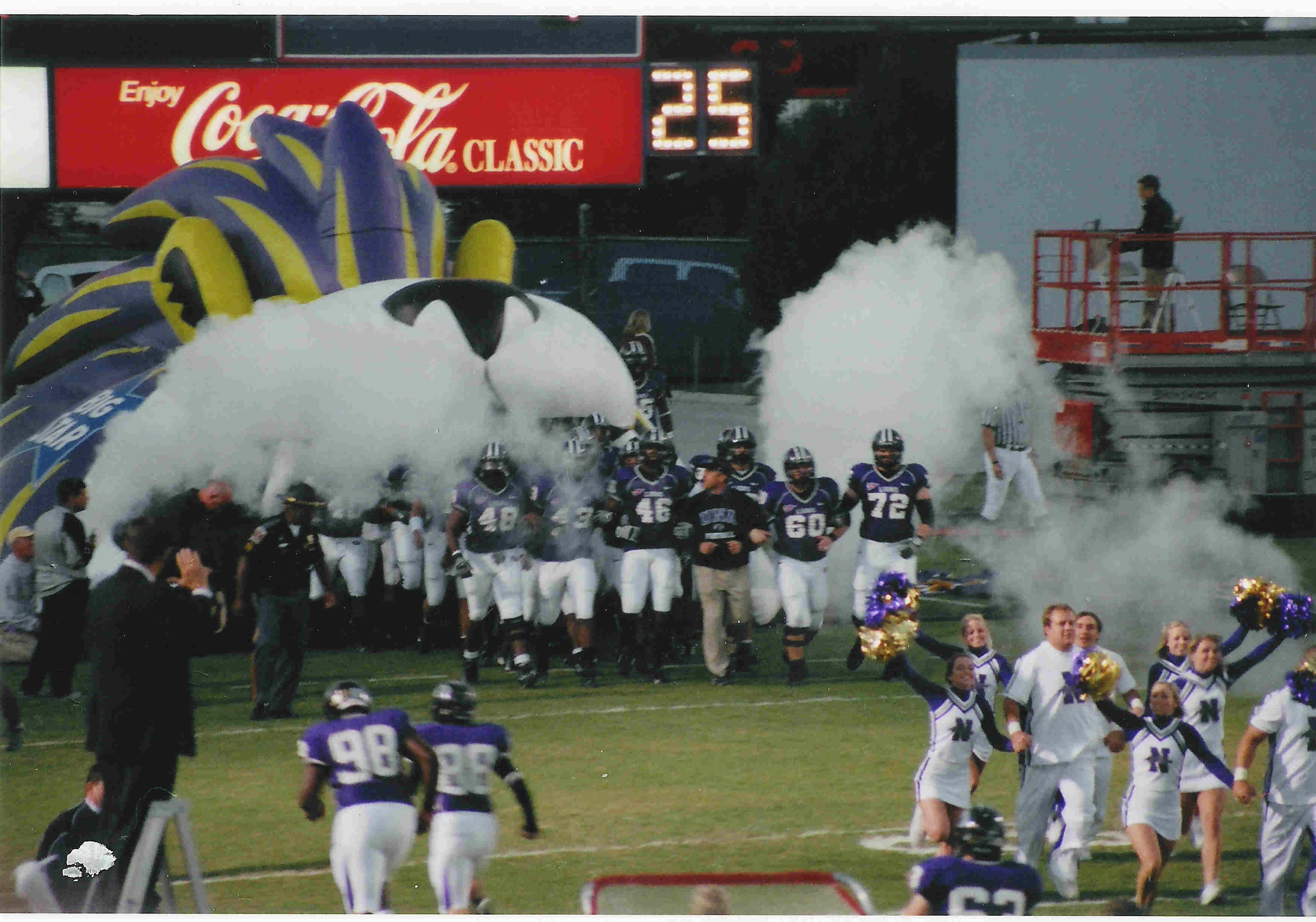
UNA Lions emerging from the Lion Victory Tunnel at Braly Municipal Stadium before the start of a UNA home game in 2007.

Following a 4-year interlude under Bill Hyde, Mark Hudspeth assumed the head coaching job at UNA in 2002. After a disappointing first year, Hudspeth led the Lions to another string of Division II playoff games.

In his first five seasons at UNA, Hudspeth posted the best record of any previous Lion head coach in their first five years – leading the Lions to a 44–17 mark, two Gulf South Conference titles, and three NCAA Division II playoff appearances. Hudspeth left UNA after the 2008 season to become an assistant under newly hired Mississippi State coach Dan Mullen.

=== Terry Bowden ===
Former Auburn head coach Terry Bowden was named the new head coach on January 1, 2009. Bowden's brother, Jeff Bowden, also joined Terry at UNA as the WR coach. Pre-season hype focused on Bowden's remedy to a re-building roster by acquiring over twenty-five transfers from Division I schools including several from his father's Florida State team. The 2009 campaign would climax late in the season with an undefeated 10–0 record and the school's return to the #1 ranking for the first time since 1996. The season wrapped up with a UNA loss in the regional finals with an 11–2 record.

Bowden left after the 2011 season to take the head coaching job at Akron.

=== Bobby Wallace (second stint) ===
Wallace returned in 2012 for a second stint as head coach after Bowden's departure. Wallace led the Lions to four consecutive Gulf South Conference Championships and NCAA post-season appearances. Wallace ranks as the winningest football coach in Gulf South Conference history with 149 wins in his 19 years in the league. The 2012 season was a transition year for the Lions who finished fourth in the conference standings with a 5–5 overall record. After a successful off-season, the 2013 Lions had an impressive 10–3 record and shared the GSC title with in-state rival West Alabama. In 2014 Wallace led UNA to a 9–2 record that included winning a share of a second straight GSC Championship and a second straight berth in the Division II Playoffs. In 2015, coach Wallace led the Lions to a 9–3 record and shared their third consecutive GSC Championship with West Georgia and another Division II Playoff appearance. Wallace won his fourth consecutive GSC title outright in 2016 by going undefeated in conference play and received a fourth straight berth to the Division II Playoffs as the No. 1 seed in Region II. The Lions defeated UNC-Pembroke 41–17 in the second round, shutout North Greenville 38–0 in the quarterfinals, and went on to the semifinals winning at Shepherd 23–13, advancing to the national championship game. UNA fell to Northwest Missouri State 29–3 in the national championship and finished No. 2 in the final AFCA poll. Coach Wallace retired from UNA on December 20, 2016. Wallace finished his 15-year career at UNA with a 126–51–1 (.711) record, making him the winningest football coach in school history.

=== Chris Willis ===
Chris Willis was named head coach on December 22, 2016. Coach Willis has spent fifteen years on the UNA football staff and five years as defensive coordinator. Willis finished the 2017 season with a 5–5 record, avoiding the school's first losing season since 2002. The Lions finished tied for second in the GSC (with four other teams) and missed the playoffs for the first time since 2012. Because of NCAA transitional rules, the Lions will not be eligible for postseason until 2022 as a transitioning school to Division I. The Lions finished their first season in the FCS with a 7–3 record, and were 3–2 versus FCS opponents. The Lions fell to 4–7 during the 2019 campaign after playing a tough non-conference schedule featuring prominent FCS programs such as Montana and Jacksonville State. Big South Conference games did not count towards the standings due to transition rules; however, UNA finished with a 3–4 conference record.

=== Brent Dearmon ===
Brent Dearmon was hired as the head coach on December 3, 2022. Coach Dearmon had previously been an offensive coordinator at Kansas and Florida Atlantic. In his one previous year of head coaching, he led his alma mater, Bethel University, to an undefeated regular season before a loss in the NAIA playoffs. In his first year as coach, the Lions would play one of the toughest schedules on the FCS level. With this schedule, North Alabama would go 3–8 overall and go 1–5 in United Athletic Conference play.

== Seasons ==
National champion	Conference champion

Season	Coach	Conference	Season results				Conference results			Playoffs
Season	Coach	Conference	Conference finish	Wins	Losses	Ties	Wins	Losses	Ties	Playoffs
North Alabama Lions
1949	Hal Self	Alabama Collegiate		4	5	0				
1950	Hal Self	Alabama Collegiate		5	4	0				
1951	Hal Self	Alabama Collegiate		6	3	0				
1952	Hal Self	Alabama Collegiate		8	1	0				
1953	Hal Self	Alabama Collegiate		6	1	1				
1954	Hal Self	Alabama Collegiate		8	2	0				
1955	Hal Self	Alabama Collegiate		7	3	0				
1956	Hal Self	Alabama Collegiate		6	3	0				
1957	Hal Self	Alabama Collegiate		6	4	0				
1958	Hal Self	Alabama Collegiate		4	5	0				
1959	Hal Self	Alabama Collegiate		5	4	1				
1960	Hal Self	Alabama Collegiate		7	3	0				
1961	Hal Self	Alabama Collegiate		7	3	0				
1962	Hal Self	Alabama Collegiate		5	4	1				
1963	Hal Self	Alabama Collegiate		3	5	2				
1964	Hal Self	Alabama Collegiate		2	6	1				
1965	Hal Self	Alabama Collegiate		4	6	0				
1966	Hal Self	Alabama Collegiate		4	4	1				
1967	Hal Self	Alabama Collegiate		2	6	1				
1968	Hal Self	Alabama Collegiate		5	5	0				
1969	Hal Self	Alabama Collegiate		5	4	0				
1970	Durell Mock	Mid-South Athletic	5th	5	5	0	1	4	0	
1971	Durell Mock	Gulf South	6th	1	10	0	0	6	0	
1972	Durell Mock	Gulf South	9th	2	9	0	1	5	0	
1973	Mickey Andrews	Gulf South	8th	4	6	0	3	6	0	
1974	Mickey Andrews	Gulf South	6th	4	6	0	4	4	0	
1975	Mickey Andrews	Gulf South	6th	6	4	0	4	4	0	
1976	Mickey Andrews	Gulf South	6th	4	5	1	3	4	0	
1977	Wayne Grubb	Gulf South	6th	5	5	0	3	5	0	
1978	Wayne Grubb	Gulf South	5th	7	2	1	4	2	1	
1979	Wayne Grubb	Gulf South	4th	6	5	0	3	3	0	
1980	Wayne Grubb	Gulf South	1st	10	2	0	6	0	0	Semifinals — Division II Playoffs
1981	Wayne Grubb	Gulf South	2nd	8	2	0	4	2	0	
1982	Wayne Grubb	Gulf South	3rd	7	3	0	4	3	0	
1983	Wayne Grubb	Gulf South	1st	11	1	1	8	0	0	Semifinals — Division II Playoffs
1984	Wayne Grubb	Gulf South	2nd	7	1	3	4	1	3	
1985	Wayne Grubb	Gulf South	1st	12	2	0	7	1	0	Championship Game — Division II Playoffs
1986	Wayne Grubb	Gulf South	9th	4	7	0	1	7	0	
1987	Wayne Grubb	Gulf South	3rd	5 (Note: UNA forfeited two wins due to an ineligible player. This moved their win total from seven to five.)	5	1	4	3	1	
1988	Bobby Wallace	Gulf South	8th	2	8	0	2	6	0	
1989	Bobby Wallace	Gulf South	5th	6	5	0	4	4	0	
1990	Bobby Wallace	Gulf South	2nd	8	3	0	6	2	0	First Round — Division II Playoffs
1991	Bobby Wallace	Gulf South	6th	3	7	0	1	5	0	
1992	Bobby Wallace	Gulf South	2nd	7	4	1	3	2	1	Quarterfinals — Division II Playoffs
1993	Bobby Wallace	Gulf South	1st	14	0	0	7	0	0	Champions — Division II Playoffs
1994	Bobby Wallace	Gulf South	1st	13	1	0	7	0	0	Champions — Division II Playoffs
1995	Bobby Wallace	Gulf South	1st	14	0	0	8	0	0	Champions — Division II Playoffs
1996	Bobby Wallace	Gulf South	5th	6	5		4	4		
1997	Bobby Wallace	Gulf South	3rd	9	3		6	2		First Round — Division II Playoffs
1998	Bill Hyde	Gulf South	3rd	8	2		7	2		
1999	Bill Hyde	Gulf South	5th	5	6		5	4		
2000	Bill Hyde	Gulf South	8th	3	7		3	6		
2001	Bill Hyde	Gulf South	9th	4	6		3	6		
2002	Mark Hudspeth	Gulf South	9th	4	7		3	6		
2003	Mark Hudspeth	Gulf South	1st	13	1		9	0		Semifinals — Division II Playoffs
2004	Mark Hudspeth	Gulf South	6th	5	5		4	5		
2005	Mark Hudspeth	Gulf South	2nd	11	3		7	2		Semifinals — Division II Playoffs
2006	Mark Hudspeth	Gulf South	1st	11	1		8	0		Quarterfinals — Division II Playoffs
2007	Mark Hudspeth	Gulf South	2nd	10	2		7	1		Super Regional Finals — Division II Playoffs
2008	Mark Hudspeth	Gulf South	2nd	12	2		7	1		Semifinals — Division II Playoffs
2009	Terry Bowden	Gulf South	1st	11	2		7	1		Super Regional Finals — Division II Playoffs
2010	Terry Bowden	Gulf South	4th	9	4		5	3		Second Round — Division II Playoffs
2011	Terry Bowden	Gulf South	4th	9	3		2	2		Second Round — Division II Playoffs
2012	Bobby Wallace	Gulf South	4th	5	5		2	3		
2013	Bobby Wallace	Gulf South	T–1st	10	3		5	1		Quarterfinals — Division II Playoffs
2014	Bobby Wallace	Gulf South	T–1st	9	2		6	1		First Round — Division II Playoffs
2015	Bobby Wallace	Gulf South	T–1st	9	3		6	1		Second Round — Division II Playoffs
2016	Bobby Wallace	Gulf South	1st	11	2		7	0		Championship Game — Division II Playoffs
2017	Chris Willis	Gulf South	2nd	5	5		5	3		
2018	Chris Willis	Independent	N/A	7	3					
2019	Chris Willis	Big South	N/A	4	7					
2020	Chris Willis	Big South, Independent (Note: Due to the COVID-19 pandemic, the Big South Conference moved its football season to the spring. UNA opted out of conference play to compete in a four-game non-conference slate in the fall.)	N/A	0	4					
2021	Chris Willis	Big South	4th	3	8		3	4		
2022	Chris Willis, Ryan Held (Note: Chris Willis was relived of his coaching duties midseason. Ryan Held was elevated to interim head coach for the last three games of the season.)	ASUN	6th	1	10		0	5		
2023	Brent Dearmon	United Athletic (Note: This was the football-only version of the United Athletic Conference, which was folded into the current all-sports UAC (previously the Western Athletic Conference) in July 2026.)	7th	3	8		1	5		
2024	Brent Dearmon	United Athletic	7th	3	9		3	5		
2025	Brent Dearmon	United Athletic	9th	2	10		1	7		
2026	Brent Dearmon	United Athletic								

== NCAA Division II playoff results ==
The Lions appeared in the NCAA Division II Football Championship playoffs 21 times, compiling an overall record of 35–18. They were national champions in 1993, 1994, and 1995.

Year	Round	Opponent	Result
1980	Quarterfinals; Semifinals	Virginia Union; Eastern Illinois	W 17–8; L 31–56
1983	Quarterfinals; Semifinals	Virginia Union; Central State	W 16–14; L 24–27
1985	Quarterfinals; Semifinals; National Championship	Fort Valley State; Bloomsburg; North Dakota State	W 14–7; W 34–0; L 7–35
1989	First Round	Jacksonville State	L 14–38
1992	First Round; Quarterfinals	Hampton; Jacksonville State	W 33–21; L 12–14
1993	First Round; Quarterfinals; Semifinals; National Championship	Carson-Newman; Hampton; Texas A&M-Kingsville; Indiana-Pennsylvania	W 38–28; W 45–20; W 27–25; W 41–34
1994	First Round; Quarterfinals; Semifinals; National Championship	Carson-Newman; Valdosta State; North Dakota; Texas A&M-Kingsville	W 17–13; W 27–24 ^{2OT} W 35–7; W 16–10
1995	First Round; Quarterfinals; Semifinals; National Championship	Albany State; Carson-Newman; Ferris State; Pittsburg State	W 38–28; W 28–7; W 45–7; W 27–7
1997	First Round	Carson-Newman	L 6–23
2003	First Round; Quarterfinals; Semifinals	Southern Arkansas; Carson-Newman; North Dakota	W 48–24; W 41–9; L 22–29
2005	First Round; Second Round; Quarterfinals; Semifinals	Valdosta State; N.C. Central; Central Arkansas; Northwest Missouri State	W 40–13; W 24–21; W 41–38 ^{OT} L 25–26
2006	Second Round; Quarterfinals	Newberry; Delta State	W 38–20; L 10–27
2007	Second Round; Quarterfinals	Delta State; Valdosta State	W 20–17; L 23–37
2008	Second Round; Quarterfinals; Semifinals	Valdosta State; Delta State; Northwest Missouri State	W 37–10; W 55–34; L 7–41
2009	Second Round; Quarterfinals	Arkansas Tech; Carson-Newman	W 41–28; L 21–24
2010	First Round; Second Round	Valdosta State; Delta State	W 43–20; L 24–47
2011	First Round; Second Round	West Alabama; Delta State	W 43–27; L 14–42
2013	First Round; Second Round; Quarterfinals	Tuskegee; UNC Pembroke; Lenoir-Rhyne	W 30–27; W 37–13; L 39–42
2014	First Round	Valdosta State	L 31–33
2015	First Round; Second Round	Newberry; Tuskegee	W 50–7; L 31–35
2016	Second Round; Quarterfinals; Semifinals; National Championship	UNC Pembroke; North Greenville; Shepherd; Northwest Missouri State	W 41–17; W 38–0; W 23–13; L 3–29

== Future non-conference opponents ==
Announced schedules as of November 20, 2026.

2027	2028	2029	2030	2031	2032
at North Carolina	at Mississippi State	Southeast Missouri State	UT Martin	at Virginia Tech	at Auburn
at Middle Tennessee	at Auburn	at North Texas	at Vanderbilt		
Morehead State		at UT Martin			
		at Western Illinois			

== NFL Draft picks ==
Draft	Player	Pos	Team	Round	Pick
1954	Harlon Hill	WR	Chicago Bears	15th	174
1961	Sammy Smith	HB	Denver Broncos (AFL)	27th	201
1980	Curtis Sirmones	RB	San Diego Chargers	8th	219
1980	William Bowens	LB	Oakland Raiders	5th	128
1980	Marcene Emmett	DB	Washington Redskins	12th	327
1981	Jerry Hill	WR	Washington Redskins	11th	284
1985	Daryl Smith	DB	Denver Broncos	9th	250
1986	Lewis Billups	DB	Cincinnati Bengals	2nd	38
1986	Bruce Jones	DB	Chicago Bears	7th	194
1986	Billy Witt	DE	Buffalo Bills	11th	282
1987	Chris Goode	RB	Indianapolis Colts	10th	253
1988	Shawn Lee	DT	Tampa Bay Buccaneers	6th	163
1988	Wendell Phillips	DB	San Diego Chargers	12th	324
1996	Israel Raybon	DE	Pittsburgh Steelers	5th	163
1996	Jarius Hayes	TE	Arizona Cardinals	7th	212
1996	Marcus Keyes	DT	Chicago Bears	7th	233
1999	Bobby Collins	TE	Buffalo Bills	4th	122
1999	Tyrone Bell	DB	San Diego Chargers	6th	178
2012	Janoris Jenkins	DB	St. Louis Rams	2nd	39

== Program achievements ==
Alabama Collegiate Conference Champions	1960, 1961, 1962, 1963
Gulf South Conference Champions	1980, 1983, 1985, 1993, 1994, 1995, 2003, 2006, 2009, 2013, 2014, 2015, 2016
NCAA Division II Team Playoff Participants	1980, 1983, 1985, 1990, 1992, 1993, 1994, 1995, 1997, 2003, 2005, 2006, 2007, 2008, 2009, 2010, 2011, 2013, 2014, 2015, 2016
NCAA Division II Regional Championships	1980, 1983, 1985, 1993, 1994, 1995, 2003, 2005, 2008, 2016
NCAA Division II National Championships	1993, 1994, 1995

== All-time record vs. current UAC teams ==
Official record (including any NCAA imposed vacates and forfeits) against all current UAC opponents as of the completion of the 2025 season.

Opponent	Won	Lost	Tied	Pct.	Streak	First meeting
Abilene Christian	2	2	0	.500	Lost 1	2011
Austin Peay	13	9	0	.591	Lost 4	1949
Central Arkansas	15	9	0	.625	Lost 4	1951
Eastern Kentucky	1	3	0	.250	Won 1	2022
Tarleton State	1	5	0	.167	Lost 4	2012
West Florida	1	2	0	.333	Lost 2	2018
West Georgia	23	14	0	.622	Lost 1	1983
Totals	56	44	0	.560		

== Attendance ==
The largest crowd for a UNA football game at Braly Stadium is 15,631, which was achieved on December 12, 1993, against the Indiana University of Pennsylvania. The previous record was 14,683, set in the season home opener in 1990.

=== Single game attendance ===
Team	Date	Score	Attendance	Stadium
IUP	December 12, 1993	W 41–34	15,631	Braly Stadium
Pittsburg State	December 9, 1995	W 27–7	15,341	Braly Stadium
Alabama A&M	September 1, 1990	W 25–0	14,683	Braly Stadium
Alabama A&M	September 10, 1994	W 58–13	14,217	Braly Stadium
Alabama A&M	September 7, 1996	W 47–0	13,697	Braly Stadium
Texas A&M–Kingsville	December 10, 1994	W 16-10	13,526	Braly Stadium
Alabama A&M	September 19, 1992	W 15–7	12,898	Braly Stadium
Alabama A&M	September 14, 2019	L 24–31	12,767	Braly Stadium
Southern Arkansas	August 29, 2019	W 48–6	12,644	Braly Stadium
West Alabama	November 2, 2013	W 30–27 ^{OT}	12,526	Braly Stadium

== Stadium ==
=== Braly Municipal Stadium (1949-2025) ===
The Lions have played at Braly Municipal Stadium since its first season in 1949. In this period, Braly has seen many memorable moments for the Lions. Most notably, Braly Stadium served as the host site of the 1993, 1994, and 1995 Division II National Championship Games where the Lions won 3 National Championships in a row. The 1993 National Championship Game, in particular, would become the most attended game in stadium history with an attendance of 15,631.

The Lions played their last season at Braly Stadium in 2025. They played their last game at the stadium on November 22 when they lost to Southern Utah 36-34 in double over time.

North Alabama finished their 77-year tenure at the stadium with an all-time record of 281-135-8. It also saw the Lions tie the Division II record for longest home win streak as they won 28 straight games from September 1993 to September 1994.

=== Bank Independent Stadium (2026-present) ===
On June 8, 2023, the university board of trustees unanimously approved the construction of a new on-campus stadium. The stadium, currently named Bank Independent Stadium, is set to be a multi-purpose stadium that will house the UNA football, soccer, and baseball teams. The stadium entered the design phase in Summer of 2023 and the university is aiming to be complete with construction by 2026 or 2027.

== Tradition ==
=== Purple Swarm and #44 ===
The Purple Swarm was the nickname for the UNA defense during the mid-1990s. In 1994 and 1995, the UNA defense was one of the best on the Division II level and was a major contributor to the three consecutive national championships. This defense also produced seven different All-Americans. In 2023, first-year head coach Brent Dearmon revived the Purple Swarm name as a way to preserve tradition through the Division I transition. He stated that, “Tradition is a big thing and I didn’t want, through all the transition, there to be a loss of that around this place.” He did so by aiming to build a “Purple Swarm” defense. He also brought back the helmet design from the mid-1990s. Another way that Dearmon aimed to honor tradition was by honoring Ronald McKinnon. During his time at UNA, McKinnon donned the #44 jersey number. Dearmon decided to start a new tradition by giving the #44 to a defensive leader each year. For the first year of the tradition in 2023, Phillip Ossai was given the honor to wear the #44. Since 2024, Jyheam Ingram has worn the #44.

=== Spirit Hill and the Lion Walk ===
Spirit Hill is the site of pregame tailgates. It is adjacent to Braly Stadium. 2 hours prior to kickoff, the Lions pass through Spirit Hill on their way into the stadium, in what is known as the Lion Walk.

=== UNA Field Flag ===
Starting in the mid-1990s, a 60' x 60' flag with the letters "UNA" was walked onto the field during pregame. Up to 60 participants would carry the flag onto the field in an honor that many campus organizations would have to sign up for during the pre-season to participate in. The tradition almost lasted 20 years and is no longer a part of pre-game ceremonies.

=== Victory Flame ===
From 1962 to 1986, a victory flame stood on campus before it was demolished for construction of a new commons building. A new Victory Flame was constructed in 1995 adjacent to its original site. The flame is lit after every UNA victory or after a significant event in the university's history. A replica of the Victory Flame stands atop the Lions’ locker room at Braly Stadium.

=== Pride Rock ===
The Pride Rock was introduced in 1994 as a way to remind the current players of the school's proud tradition and of all former players that have donned a North Alabama uniform. The Pride Rock is a 60-pound granite stone with the actual paw print of the UNA's live lion mascot, Leo I. It is placed at the north end zone for the players to touch as they make their entrance pre-game.
