= Charles McGibbony =

American football player and coach (1915–2008)

Biographical details
- Born: October 23, 1915; Pine Bluff, Arkansas, U.S.
- Died: March 24, 2008 (aged 92); Conway, Arkansas, U.S.

Playing career

Football
- 1939: Alabama
- 1940–1941: Arkansas State Teachers
- 1944: Brooklyn Tigers
- Positions: Quarterback, tailback

Coaching career (HC unless noted)

Football
- 1945–1946: Arkansas State Teachers
- 1947–1949: Arkansas (assistant)
- 1950–1951: Hot Springs HS (AR)
- 1952: Arizona (def. assistant)
- 1954: Hot Springs HS (AR)
- 1955: Fort Smith HS (AR) (assistant)
- 1963–1969: Southside HS (AR)

Basketball
- 1945–1946: Arkansas State Teachers

Head coaching record
- Overall: 3–12 (college football); 16–10 (college basketball)

Charles William "Dub" McGibbony (October 23, 1915 – March 24, 2008) was an American football player and coach. He played for the Brooklyn Tigers of the National Football League (NFL) for one season in 1944. McGibbony served as the head football coach and head basketball coach at Arkansas State Teachers College—now known as the University of Central Arkansas—in Conway, Arkansas, from 1945 to 1946. He was later an assistant football coach at the University of Arkansas.

== Head coaching record ==
=== College football ===
Year	Team	Overall	Conference	Standing	Bowl/playoffs
Arkansas State Teachers Bears (Arkansas Intercollegiate Conference) (1945–1946)
1945	Arkansas State Teachers	1–6			
1946	Arkansas State Teachers	2–6	1–3	6th	
Arkansas State Teachers:		3–12			
Total:		3–12			
