= 2009 NCAA Division II football season =

American college football season

- Regular season: August 29 – November 7, 2009
- Playoffs: November 14 – December 12, 2009
- National Championship: Braly Municipal Stadium; Florence, AL
- Champion: Northwest Missouri State
- Harlon Hill Trophy: Joique Bell, Wayne State (MI)

The 2009 NCAA Division II football season, part of college football in the United States organized by the National Collegiate Athletic Association at the Division II level, began on August 29, 2009, and concluded with the NCAA Division II Football Championship on December 12, 2009 at Braly Municipal Stadium in Florence, Alabama, hosted by the University of North Alabama. The Northwest Missouri State Bearcats defeated the Grand Valley State, 30–23, to win their third Division II national title.

The Harlon Hill Trophy was awarded to Joique Bell, running back from Wayne State.

== Conference and program changes ==
School	Former conference	New conference
Incarnate Word Cardinals	New program	Independent
New Haven Chargers	Program revived	NE-10
Ohio Dominican Panthers	MSFA (NAIA)	Independent
Urbana Blue Knights	Independent (NAIA)	Independent
Western Washington Vikings	GNAC	Dropped program

Lake Erie completed their transition to Division II and became eligible for the postseason.

== Conference standings ==
=== Super Region 1 ===
2009 Central Intercollegiate Athletic Association football standings
	Conf.			Overall
Team	W		L	W		L
Eastern
Bowie State xy	5	–	2	6	–	5
Elizabeth City State # x	5	–	2	7	–	4
Virginia Union x	5	–	2	6	–	4
Virginia State	4	–	3	6	–	4
Saint Paul's	3	–	4	4	–	5
Western
Fayetteville State xy$^	6	–	1	8	–	4
Shaw	5	–	2	8	–	2
St. Augustine's	4	–	3	4	–	6
Johnson C. Smith	2	–	5	3	–	7
Chowan	2	–	5	2	–	8
Livingstone	0	–	7	0	–	10
Championship: Fayetteville State 21, Bowie State 10
$ – Conference champion; x – Division champion/co-champions; y – Championship game participant; ^ – NCAA Division II playoff participant; # – Pioneer Bowl participant Lincoln (PA) played a full CIAA schedule as a provisional Division II member.; Rankings from AFCA Poll

2009 Northeast-10 Conference football standings
	Conf.			Overall
Team	W		L	W		L
Bentley +	6	–	2	8	–	2
Merrimack +	6	–	2	7	–	3
Southern Connecticut +	6	–	2	6	–	4
Assumption	5	–	3	6	–	4
New Haven	4	–	4	5	–	5
Stonehill	4	–	4	5	–	5
American International	3	–	5	5	–	5
Saint Anselm	1	–	7	2	–	8
Pace	1	–	7	1	–	9
+ – Conference co-champions

2009 Pennsylvania State Athletic Conference football standings
	Conf.			Overall
Team	W		L	W		L
East
No. 15 Shippensburg xy$^	6	–	1	9	–	2
Bloomsburg	5	–	2	8	–	3
West Chester	5	–	2	7	–	4
C. W. Post	5	–	2	6	–	5
East Stroudsburg ^	4	–	3	8	–	4
Millersville	2	–	5	3	–	8
Kutztown	1	–	6	3	–	8
Cheyney	0	–	7	0	–	11
West
No. 7 California (PA) xy^	7	–	0	11	–	4
Clarion	6	–	1	8	–	3
No. 24 Edinboro ^	5	–	2	9	–	3
Gannon	3	–	4	6	–	5
Slippery Rock	3	–	4	6	–	5
Mercyhurst	3	–	4	4	–	7
IUP	1	–	6	5	–	6
Lock Haven	0	–	7	0	–	10
Championship: Shippensburg 42, California (PA) 35
$ – Conference champion; x – Division champion/co-champions; y – Championship game participant; ^ – NCAA Division II playoff participant; Rankings from AFCA poll

2009 West Virginia Intercollegiate Athletic Conference football standings
	Conf.			Overall
Team	W		L	W		L
No. 9 West Liberty $^	8	–	0	11	–	2
Charleston (WV)	6	–	2	9	–	2
Glenville State	6	–	2	7	–	4
Shepherd	5	–	3	7	–	4
Concord	4	–	4	6	–	5
Fairmont State	3	–	5	3	–	8
West Virginia State	2	–	6	3	–	7
West Virginia Wesleyan	2	–	6	2	–	8
Seton Hill	0	–	8	1	–	10
$ – Conference champion; ^ – NCAA Division II playoff participant; Rankings from AFCA Poll

=== Super Region 2 ===
2009 Gulf South Conference football standings
	Conf.			Overall
Team	W		L	W		L
No. 6 North Alabama $^	7	–	1	11	–	2
No. 18 Arkansas Tech ^	6	–	2	9	–	3
No. 21 West Alabama ^	5	–	3	8	–	5
Valdosta State	5	–	3	6	–	4
Ouachita Baptist	4	–	4	6	–	4
Delta State	4	–	4	5	–	5
Arkansas–Monticello	4	–	4	5	–	6
Harding	3	–	5	5	–	6
Henderson State	3	–	5	3	–	7
Southern Arkansas	2	–	6	3	–	7
West Georgia	1	–	7	1	–	9
$ – Conference champion; ^ – NCAA Division II playoff participant; Rankings from AFCA poll

2009 South Atlantic Conference football standings
	Conf.			Overall
Team	W		L	W		L
No. 4 Carson–Newman $^	7	–	0	11	–	3
Wingate	5	–	2	7	–	3
Mars Hill	4	–	3	6	–	4
Newberry	4	–	3	6	–	4
Brevard	3	–	4	7	–	4
Lenoir–Rhyne	2	–	5	5	–	6
Tusculum	2	–	5	3	–	7
Catawba	1	–	6	4	–	6
$ – Conference champion; ^ – NCAA Division II playoff participant; Rankings from AFCA poll

2009 Southern Intercollegiate Athletic Conference football standings
	Conf.			Overall
Team	W		L	W		L
No. 17 Tuskegee # $	8	–	1	10	–	2
No. 22 Albany State ^	7	–	2	8	–	3
Benedict	6	–	3	8	–	3
Morehouse	6	–	3	7	–	3
Fort Valley State	6	–	3	7	–	4
Kentucky State	4	–	5	6	–	5
Miles	3	–	6	4	–	7
Clark Atlanta	3	–	6	3	–	7
Stillman	2	–	7	4	–	7
Lane	0	–	9	0	–	10
$ – Conference champion; ^ – NCAA Division II playoff participant; # – Pioneer Bowl participant; Rankings from AFCA Poll

2009 NCAA Division II Super Region 2 independents football records
	Conf.			Overall
Team	W		L	W		L
No. 20 UNC Pembroke ^		–		9	–	2
North Greenville		–		2	–	8
Lincoln (PA) #		–		5	–	5
^ – NCAA Division II playoff participant; # – Provisional Division II member; Rankings from AFCA Poll

=== Super Region 3 ===
2009 Great Lakes Intercollegiate Athletic Conference football standings
	Conf.			Overall
Team	W		L	W		L
No. 2 Grand Valley State $^	9	–	1	13	–	2
No. 11 Hillsdale ^	8	–	2	10	–	3
No. 19 Saginaw Valley State ^	8	–	2	9	–	3
Northwood	7	–	3	7	–	3
Findlay	6	–	4	7	–	4
Northern Michigan	6	–	4	6	–	4
Ashland	6	–	4	6	–	5
Wayne State (MI)	5	–	5	6	–	5
Indianapolis	3	–	7	4	–	7
Michigan Tech	2	–	8	2	–	8
Ferris State	0	–	10	1	–	10
Tiffin	0	–	10	0	–	11
$ – Conference champion; ^ – NCAA Division II playoff participant; Rankings from AFCA poll

2009 Northern Sun Intercollegiate Conference football standings
	Conf.			Overall
Team	W		L	W		L
North Division
No. 5 Minnesota–Duluth $^	10	–	0	11	–	2
Bemidji State	7	–	3	8	–	3
St. Cloud State	7	–	3	7	–	4
Mary	5	–	5	5	–	6
Northern State	2	–	8	2	–	9
Minnesota State–Moorhead	1	–	9	2	–	9
Minnesota–Crookston	0	–	10	1	–	10
South Division
No. 12 Minnesota State ^	9	–	1	10	–	2
Wayne State (NE)	7	–	3	8	–	3
Augustana (SD) #	7	–	3	8	–	4
Winona State	6	–	4	7	–	4
SW Minnesota State	4	–	6	5	–	6
Concordia–St. Paul	3	–	7	3	–	8
Upper Iowa	2	–	8	3	–	8
$ – Conference champion; ^ – NCAA Division II playoff participant; # – Mineral Water Bowl participant; Rankings from AFCA Poll

2009 Rocky Mountain Athletic Conference football standings
	Conf.			Overall
Team	W		L	W		L
No. 8 Nebraska–Kearney $^	9	–	0	11	–	2
Colorado Mines	8	–	1	8	–	3
Chadron State	6	–	3	7	–	4
CSU Pueblo	6	–	3	7	–	4
Adams State	5	–	4	5	–	6
Mesa State	5	–	4	5	–	6
Western State	3	–	6	3	–	8
Western New Mexico	1	–	8	2	–	8
Fort Lewis	1	–	8	2	–	9
New Mexico Highlands	1	–	8	1	–	10
$ – Conference champion; ^ – NCAA Division II playoff participant; Rankings from AFCA Poll

2009 Great Lakes Football Conference standings
	Conf.			Overall
Team	W		L	W		L
Saint Joseph's (IN) $	4	–	0	5	–	6
Missouri S&T	2	–	1	4	–	7
Kentucky Wesleyan	2	–	2	2	–	9
Central State (OH)	1	–	2	1	–	10
Lincoln (MO)	0	–	4	0	–	11
$ – Conference champion

2009 NCAA Division II Super Region 3 independents football records
	Conf.			Overall
Team	W		L	W		L
Ohio Dominican #		–		7	–	3
Lake Erie		–		7	–	4
Urbana #		–		6	–	5
# – Provisional Division II member; Rankings from AFCA Poll

=== Super Region 4 ===
2009 Great Northwest Athletic Conference football standings
	Conf.			Overall
Team	W		L	W		L
No. 3 Central Washington $^	6	–	0	12	–	1
Western Oregon	3	–	3	5	–	5
Dixie State	2	–	4	4	–	7
Humboldt State	1	–	5	5	–	5
$ – Conference champion; ^ – NCAA Division II playoff participant; Rankings from AFCA Poll

2009 Lone Star Conference football standings
	Conf.			Overall
Team	W		L	W		L
North
SE Oklahoma State	5	–	4	7	–	4
Texas A&M–Commerce	5	–	4	5	–	5
Central Oklahoma	4	–	5	4	–	7
Northeastern State	2	–	7	2	–	9
SW Oklahoma State	1	–	8	1	–	10
East Central	0	–	9	0	–	11
South
No. 10 Tarleton State +^	7	–	2	10	–	3
No. 14 Midwestern St. +^	7	–	2	9	–	3
No. 16 Texas A&M–Kingsville +^	7	–	2	9	–	3
No. 13 Abilene Christian ^	6	–	3	9	–	4
West Texas A&M #	6	–	3	7	–	5
Angelo State	5	–	4	6	–	5
Eastern New Mexico †	2	–	7	3	–	8
+ – Conference co-champions; ^ – NCAA Division II playoff participant; # – Kanza Bowl participant † – Eastern New Mexico vacated all three wins; Rankings from AFCA Poll

2009 Mid-America Intercollegiate Athletics Association football standings
	Conf.			Overall
Team	W		L	W		L
No. 1 NW Missouri State $^	9	–	0	14	–	1
Missouri Western #	6	–	3	9	–	3
Central Missouri	6	–	3	8	–	3
No. 25 Washburn	6	–	3	8	–	3
Nebraska–Omaha #	6	–	3	7	–	5
Fort Hays State	4	–	5	6	–	5
Pittsburg State	3	–	6	5	–	6
Missouri Southern	3	–	6	3	–	7
Emporia State	1	–	8	2	–	9
Truman	1	–	8	2	–	9
$ – Conference champion; ^ – NCAA Division II playoff participant; # – bowl game participant (Missouri Western: Mineral Water Bowl, Nebraska–Omaha: Kanza Bowl; Rankings from AFCA poll)

2009 NCAA Division II Super Region 4 independents football records
	Conf.			Overall
Team	W		L	W		L
Southwest Baptist		–		6	–	5
OK Panhandle State		–		5	–	6
Incarnate Word		–		4	–	5
Rankings from AFCA Poll

== Conference summaries ==
Conference champions

Central Intercollegiate Athletic Association – Fayetteville State
Great Lakes Football Conference –Saint Joseph's (IN)
Great Lakes Intercollegiate Athletic Conference – Grand Valley State
Great Northwest Athletic Conference – Central Washington
Gulf South Conference – North Alabama
Lone Star Conference – Midwestern State, Tarleton State, and Texas A&M–Kingsville
Mid-America Intercollegiate Athletics Association – Northwest Missouri State
Northeast-10 Conference – Bentley, Merrimack, and Southern Connecticut State
Northern Sun Intercollegiate Conference – Minnesota–Duluth
Pennsylvania State Athletic Conference – Shippensburg
Rocky Mountain Athletic Conference – Nebraska–Kearney
South Atlantic Conference – Carson-Newman
Southern Intercollegiate Athletic Conference – Tuskegee
West Virginia Intercollegiate Athletic Conference – West Liberty

== Postseason ==
2009 NCAA Division II Football Championship
- Teams: 24
- Finals Site: Braly Municipal Stadium; Florence, Alabama
- Champion: Northwest Missouri State; (3rd title, title game)
- Runner-up: Grand Valley State; (6th title game)
- Semifinalists: Carson-Newman; California (PA)
- Winning coach: championship
- Attendance: TBD

The 2009 NCAA Division II National Football Championship playoffs involved 24 schools playing in a single-elimination tournament to determine the national champion of men's NCAA Division II college football.

The tournament began on November 14, 2009 and will conclude on December 13, 2009 with the 2009 NCAA Division II National Football Championship game at Braly Municipal Stadium near the campus of the University of North Alabama in Florence, Alabama.

== Participants ==
School	Conference	Season record
Abilene Christian	Lone Star Conference	8–3
Albany State	Southern Intercollegiate Athletic Conference	8–2
Arkansas Tech	Gulf South Conference	8–2
California (PA)	Pennsylvania State Athletic Conference	8–3
Carson-Newman	South Atlantic Conference	9–2
Central Washington	Great Northwest Athletic Conference	11–0
East Stroudsburg	Pennsylvania State Athletic Conference	8–3
Edinboro	Pennsylvania State Athletic Conference	8–3
Fayetteville State	Central Intercollegiate Athletic Association	8–3
Grand Valley State	Great Lakes Intercollegiate Athletic Conference	10–1
Hillsdale	Great Lakes Intercollegiate Athletic Conference	9–2
Midwestern	Lone Star Conference	9–2
Minnesota Duluth	Northern Sun Intercollegiate Conference	10–1
Minnesota State, Mankato	Northern Sun Intercollegiate Conference	10–1
Nebraska–Kearney	Rocky Mountain Athletic Conference	10–1
UNC - Pembroke	Independent	9–1
North Alabama	Gulf South Conference	10–1
Northwest Mo.	Mid-America Intercollegiate Athletics Association	10–1
Saginaw Valley	Great Lakes Intercollegiate Athletic Conference	9–2
Shippensburg	Pennsylvania State Athletic Conference	9–2
Tarleton State	Lone Star Conference	9–2
Texas A&M - Kingsville	Lone Star Conference	9–2
West Alabama	Gulf South Conference	7–4
West Liberty	West Virginia Intercollegiate Athletic Conference	10–1

=== Bids by conference ===
Conference	Total	Schools	Super Region
Central Intercollegiate Athletic Association	1	Fayetteville State	1
Great Lakes Intercollegiate Athletic Conference	3	Grand Valley State; Hillsdale; Saginaw Valley	3
Great Northwest Athletic Conference	1	Central Washington	4
Gulf South Conference	3	Arkansas Tech; North Alabama; West Alabama	2
Independent	1	UNC - Pembroke	2
Lone Star Conference	4	Abilene Christian; Midwestern State; Tarleton State; Texas A&M - Kingsville	4
Mid-America Intercollegiate Athletics Association	1	Northwest Missouri State	4
Northern Sun Intercollegiate Conference	2	Minnesota-Duluth; Minnesota-Mankato	3
Pennsylvania State Athletic Conference	4	California (PA); East Stroudsburg; Edinboro; Shippensburg	1
Rocky Mountain Athletic Conference	1	Nebraska–Kearney	3
Southern Intercollegiate Athletic Conference	1	Albany State University	2
South Atlantic Conference	1	Carson-Newman College	2
West Virginia Intercollegiate Athletic Conference	1	West Liberty	1

== Playoff format ==
The first-round games were conducted on the campus of one of the competing institutions as determined by the NCAA Division II Football Committee. Two teams in each super regional earned first-round byes. The first-round winners advanced to face a bye team in their super regional. Second-round winners met in the quarterfinals and quarterfinal winners advanced to play in the semifinals.

First-round, second-round, quarterfinal and semifinal games were played on the campus of one of the competing institutions as determined by the NCAA Division II Football Committee. The home team at the championship was determined by the Division II Football Committee and the Shoals National Championship Committee.

== National television coverage ==
The semifinal games were broadcast on ESPN, ESPN360, and CBS College Sports on December 5.

The championship game was played at Braly Municipal Stadium in Florence, Alabama and broadcast live on ESPN2 on December 12.

== Tournament notes ==
=== Final standings ===
Place	School
1st	Northwest Missouri State University
2nd	Grand Valley State University
3rd	California (PA)
3rd	Carson-Newman
5th	Central Washington
5th	Minnesota Duluth
5th	North Alabama
5th	West Liberty
9th	Abilene Christian
9th	Arkansas Tech
9th	Edinboro
9th	Hillsdale
9th	Nebraska–Kearney
9th	Shippensburg
9th	Tarleton State
9th	West Alabama
17th	Albany State
17th	East Stroudsburg
17th	Fayetteville State
17th	Midwestern
17th	Minnesota State
17th	UNC - Pembroke
17th	Saginaw Valley
17th	Texas A&M - Kingsville

=== Bracket and standings ===
==== Super Regional 1 ====
First round November 14
6	Fayetteville State	13
3	California (PA)	42
5	Edinboro	31
4	East Stroudsburg	16

Second round November 21
2	Shippensburg	21
3	California (PA)	26
1	West Liberty	84
5	Edinboro	63

Super Regional finals November 28
3	California (PA)	57
1	West Liberty	35

==== Super Regional 4 ====
First round November 14
6	Abilene Christian	24
3	Midwestern State	21
5	Tarleton State 2OT	57
4	Texas A&M–Kingsville	56

Second round November 21
2	Northwest Missouri State	35
6	Abilene Christian	10
1	Central Washington	27
5	Tarleton State	6

Super Regional finals November 28
2	Northwest Missouri State	21
1	Central Washington	20

==== Super Regional 3 ====
First round November 14
6	Hillsdale OT	27
3	Minnesota State	24
5	Saginaw Valley State	20
4	Nebraska–Kearney	35

Second round November 21
2	Grand Valley State	44
6	Hillsdale	27
1	Minnesota–Duluth	42
4	Nebraska–Kearney	7

Super Regional finals November 28
2	Grand Valley State	24
1	Minnesota–Duluth	10

==== Super Regional 2 ====
First round November 14
6	West Alabama	24
3	Albany State	22
5	UNC Pembroke	13
4	Arkansas Tech	41

Second round November 21
2	Carson–Newman	59
3	West Alabama	41
4	Arkansas Tech	28
1	North Alabama	41

Super Regional finals November 28
2	Carson–Newman	24
1	North Alabama	21

==== Semifinals and championship ====
Semifinals; December 5
SR3	Grand Valley State	41
SR2	Carson–Newman	27
SR1	California (PA)	31
SR4	Northwest Missouri State	56

Championship; December 12
SR3	Grand Valley State	23
SR4	Northwest Missouri State	30

=== Individual game results ===
==== Round 1 ====
===== Saginaw Valley vs. Nebraska–Kearney =====
	1	2	3	4	Total
Saginaw Valley	6	14	0	0	20
Nebraska–Kearney	0	7	7	21	35

===== Hillsdale vs. Minn. St. Mankato =====
	1	2	3	4	OT	Total
Hillsdale	7	7	7	3	3	27
Minn. St. Mankato	14	3	0	7	0	24

===== Arkansas Tech vs. UNC-Pembroke =====
	1	2	3	4	Total
UNC-Pembroke	0	7	6	0	13
Arkansas Tech	14	10	10	7	41

===== West Alabama vs. Albany State =====
	1	2	3	4	Total
West Alabama	0	21	3	0	24
Albany State	2	14	6	0	22

===== Edinboro vs. East Stroudsburg =====
	1	2	3	4	Total
Edinboro	3	14	7	7	31
East Stroudsburg	7	6	0	3	16

===== Fayetteville State vs. California (PA) =====
	1	2	3	4	Total
Fayetteville State	0	0	0	13	13
California (PA)	14	7	21	0	42

===== Tarleton State vs. Texas A&M - Kingsville =====
	1	2	3	4	OT	Total
Tarleton State	14	7	15	10	11	57
Texas A&M - Kingsville	7	24	8	7	10	56

===== Abilene Christian vs. Midwestern State =====
	1	2	3	4	Total
Abilene Christian	7	0	7	10	24
Midwestern State	0	14	0	7	21

==== Round 2 ====
===== Nebraska–Kearney vs. Minnesota Duluth =====
	1	2	3	4	Total
Nebraska–Kearney	0	0	0	7	7
Minnesota Duluth	14	14	14	0	42

===== Hillsdale vs. Grand Valley State =====
	1	2	3	4	Total
Hillsdale	0	0	13	14	27
Grand Valley State	10	27	7	0	44

===== Arkansas Tech vs. North Alabama =====
	1	2	3	4	Total
Arkansas Tech	7	7	0	14	28
North Alabama	14	10	17	0	41

===== West Alabama vs. Carson-Newman =====
	1	2	3	4	Total
West Alabama	0	20	21	0	41
Carson-Newman	14	35	0	10	59

===== Edinboro vs. West Liberty =====
	1	2	3	4	Total
Edinboro	7	14	21	21	63
West Liberty	28	28	21	7	84

An NCAA Division II record for combined points (147) and yards (1,394) was set during the game. Edinboro quarterback Trevor Harris set the Division II record for passing, completing 50 of 76 passes for 630 yards and 5 touchdowns.

===== California (PA) vs. Shippensburg =====
	1	2	3	4	Total
California (PA)	14	6	6	0	26
Shippensburg	7	0	8	6	21

===== Tarleton State vs. Central Washington =====
	1	2	3	4	Total
Tarleton State	3	3	0	0	6
Central Washington	7	10	3	7	27

===== Abilene Christian vs. Northwest Missouri =====
	1	2	3	4	Total
Abilene Christian	3	0	0	7	10
Northwest Missouri	7	7	14	7	35

==== Super Regional finals ====
===== Super Region 1: California (PA) vs. West Liberty =====
	1	2	3	4	Total
California (PA)	13	23	7	14	57
West Liberty	7	0	14	14	35

===== Super Region 2: Carson-Newman vs. North Alabama =====
	1	2	3	4	Total
Carson-Newman	10	0	7	7	24
North Alabama	0	7	7	7	21

===== Super Region 3: Grand Valley State vs. Minnesota Duluth =====
	1	2	3	4	Total
Grand Valley St.	14	3	7	0	24
Minnesota Duluth	10	0	0	0	10

===== Super Region 4: Northwest Missouri vs. Central Washington =====
	1	2	3	4	Total
Northwest Missouri	7	0	14	0	21
Central Washington	7	7	0	6	20

==== Semifinals ====
===== Carson-Newman vs. Grand Valley St. =====
	1	2	3	4	Total
Carson-Newman	7	7	6	7	27
Grand Valley St.	17	10	7	7	41

===== California (PA) vs. Northwest Missouri =====
	1	2	3	4	Total
California (PA)	3	7	14	7	31
Northwest Missouri	7	14	28	7	56

==== Championship ====
	1	2	3	4	Total
Northwest Missouri State	7	14	2	7	30
Grand Valley State	0	0	13	10	23

== See also ==
- 2009 NCAA Division II National Football Championship game
- 2009 NCAA Division I FBS football season
- 2009 NCAA Division I FCS football season
- 2009 NCAA Division III football season
- 2009 NAIA football season
