= List of Northern Sun Intercollegiate Conference football standings =

This is a list of yearly Northern Sun Intercollegiate Conference football standings.

== Northern Sun Intercollegiate Conference football standings ==
=== Early history ===
1934 Northern Teachers College Conference football standings
| | Conf. | | | | | Overall |
| Team | W | | L | | T | W | | L | | T |
|---|---|---|---|---|---|---|---|---|---|---|
| Duluth State $ | 3 | – | 1 | – | 0 | 6 | – | 1 | – | 0 |
| St. Cloud State | 3 | – | 2 | – | 0 | 3 | – | 4 | – | 0 |
| Moorhead State * | 2 | – | 2 | – | 0 | 4 | – | 2 | – | 1 |
| Mankato State | 2 | – | 2 | – | 0 | 2 | – | 4 | – | 1 |
| Winona State | 2 | – | 2 | – | 0 | 2 | – | 5 | – | 0 |
| Bemidji State | 1 | – | 4 | – | 0 | 3 | – | 5 | – | 0 |
$ – Conference champion; * – forfeited victories over Duluth State and Winona State because of ineligible player

=== Northern Sun Intercollegiate Conference (1992–present) ===
2004 Northern Sun Intercollegiate Conference football standings
| | Conf. | | | Overall |
| Team | W | | L | W | | L |
|---|---|---|---|---|---|---|
| No. 13 Winona State $^ | 7 | – | 0 | 10 | – | 2 |
| Bemidji State | 5 | – | 2 | 8 | – | 3 |
| Northern State # | 5 | – | 2 | 6 | – | 5 |
| Concordia–St. Paul | 4 | – | 3 | 7 | – | 4 |
| SW Minnesota State | 3 | – | 4 | 5 | – | 6 |
| Minnesota–Crookston | 2 | – | 5 | 2 | – | 8 |
| Wayne State (NE) | 2 | – | 5 | 3 | – | 8 |
| Minnesota State–Moorhead | 0 | – | 7 | 0 | – | 11 |
$ – Conference champion; ^ – NCAA Division II playoff participant; # – Mineral Water Bowl participant; Rankings from AFCA Poll

2005 Northern Sun Intercollegiate Conference football standings
| | Conf. | | | Overall |
| Team | W | | L | W | | L |
|---|---|---|---|---|---|---|
| Concordia–St. Paul # + | 6 | – | 1 | 9 | – | 3 |
| Winona State + | 6 | – | 1 | 8 | – | 3 |
| Northern State | 5 | – | 2 | 6 | – | 5 |
| Bemidji State | 4 | – | 3 | 7 | – | 3 |
| Wayne State (NE) | 4 | – | 3 | 4 | – | 7 |
| SW Minnesota State | 1 | – | 6 | 4 | – | 7 |
| Minnesota State–Moorhead | 1 | – | 6 | 1 | – | 9 |
| Minnesota–Crookston | 1 | – | 6 | 1 | – | 10 |
+ – Conference co-champions; # – Mineral Water Bowl participant

2006 Northern Sun Intercollegiate Conference football standings
| | Conf. | | | Overall |
| Team | W | | L | W | | L |
|---|---|---|---|---|---|---|
| No. 23 Bemidji State # $ | 8 | – | 0 | 9 | – | 3 |
| No. 19 Winona State ^ | 7 | – | 1 | 9 | – | 3 |
| Minnesota State–Moorhead | 4 | – | 4 | 6 | – | 5 |
| Concordia–St. Paul | 4 | – | 4 | 5 | – | 6 |
| Wayne State (NE) | 4 | – | 4 | 5 | – | 6 |
| Northern State | 3 | – | 5 | 4 | – | 7 |
| SW Minnesota State | 3 | – | 5 | 4 | – | 7 |
| Upper Iowa | 3 | – | 5 | 3 | – | 8 |
| Minnesota–Crookston | 0 | – | 8 | 0 | – | 11 |
$ – Conference champion; ^ – NCAA Division II playoff participant; # – Mineral Water Bowl participant; Rankings from AFCA Poll

2007 Northern Sun Intercollegiate Conference football standings
| | Conf. | | | Overall |
| Team | W | | L | W | | L |
|---|---|---|---|---|---|---|
| No. 23 Winona State $^ | 9 | – | 0 | 10 | – | 2 |
| Wayne State (NE) # | 7 | – | 2 | 7 | – | 5 |
| Mary | 7 | – | 2 | 7 | – | 4 |
| Bemidji State | 6 | – | 3 | 7 | – | 4 |
| Northern State | 5 | – | 4 | 5 | – | 6 |
| Concordia–St. Paul | 3 | – | 6 | 4 | – | 7 |
| Minnesota State–Moorhead | 3 | – | 6 | 4 | – | 7 |
| Upper Iowa | 2 | – | 7 | 3 | – | 8 |
| SW Minnesota State | 2 | – | 7 | 2 | – | 9 |
| Minnesota–Crookston | 1 | – | 8 | 2 | – | 8 |
$ – Conference champion; ^ – NCAA Division II playoff participant; # – Mineral Water Bowl participant; Rankings from AFCA Poll

2008 Northern Sun Intercollegiate Conference football standings
| | Conf. | | | Overall |
| Team | W | | L | W | | L |
|---|---|---|---|---|---|---|
North Division
| No. 1 Minnesota–Duluth $^ | 10 | – | 0 | 15 | – | 0 |
| St. Cloud State | 7 | – | 3 | 7 | – | 4 |
| Bemidji State | 4 | – | 6 | 5 | – | 6 |
| Mary | 4 | – | 6 | 4 | – | 7 |
| Minnesota State–Moorhead | 2 | – | 8 | 2 | – | 9 |
| Minnesota–Crookston | 1 | – | 9 | 2 | – | 9 |
| Northern State | 1 | – | 9 | 1 | – | 10 |
South Division
| No. 23 Minnesota State ^ | 9 | – | 1 | 9 | – | 3 |
| No. 19 Wayne State (NE) ^ | 8 | – | 2 | 9 | – | 3 |
| Augustana (SD) # | 7 | – | 3 | 8 | – | 4 |
| SW Minnesota State | 6 | – | 4 | 6 | – | 5 |
| Winona State | 6 | – | 4 | 6 | – | 5 |
| Concordia–St. Paul | 3 | – | 7 | 4 | – | 7 |
| Upper Iowa | 2 | – | 8 | 2 | – | 9 |
$ – Conference champion; ^ – NCAA Division II playoff participant; # – Mineral Water Bowl participant; Rankings from AFCA Poll

2009 Northern Sun Intercollegiate Conference football standings
| | Conf. | | | Overall |
| Team | W | | L | W | | L |
|---|---|---|---|---|---|---|
North Division
| No. 5 Minnesota–Duluth $^ | 10 | – | 0 | 11 | – | 2 |
| Bemidji State | 7 | – | 3 | 8 | – | 3 |
| St. Cloud State | 7 | – | 3 | 7 | – | 4 |
| Mary | 5 | – | 5 | 5 | – | 6 |
| Northern State | 2 | – | 8 | 2 | – | 9 |
| Minnesota State–Moorhead | 1 | – | 9 | 2 | – | 9 |
| Minnesota–Crookston | 0 | – | 10 | 1 | – | 10 |
South Division
| No. 12 Minnesota State ^ | 9 | – | 1 | 10 | – | 2 |
| Wayne State (NE) | 7 | – | 3 | 8 | – | 3 |
| Augustana (SD) # | 7 | – | 3 | 8 | – | 4 |
| Winona State | 6 | – | 4 | 7 | – | 4 |
| SW Minnesota State | 4 | – | 6 | 5 | – | 6 |
| Concordia–St. Paul | 3 | – | 7 | 3 | – | 8 |
| Upper Iowa | 2 | – | 8 | 3 | – | 8 |
$ – Conference champion; ^ – NCAA Division II playoff participant; # – Mineral Water Bowl participant; Rankings from AFCA Poll

2010 Northern Sun Intercollegiate Conference football standings
| | Conf. | | | Overall |
| Team | W | | L | W | | L |
|---|---|---|---|---|---|---|
North
| No. 1 Minnesota–Duluth $^ | 10 | – | 0 | 15 | – | 0 |
| No. 12 St. Cloud State ^ | 9 | – | 1 | 10 | – | 3 |
| Bemidji State | 6 | – | 4 | 7 | – | 4 |
| Mary | 4 | – | 6 | 4 | – | 7 |
| Minnesota State–Moorhead | 2 | – | 8 | 2 | – | 9 |
| Northern State | 2 | – | 8 | 2 | – | 9 |
| Minnesota–Crookston | 0 | – | 10 | 1 | – | 10 |
South
| No. 6 Augustana (SD) ^ | 9 | – | 1 | 11 | – | 2 |
| Concordia–St. Paul # | 7 | – | 3 | 8 | – | 4 |
| Winona State | 6 | – | 4 | 7 | – | 4 |
| Minnesota State | 5 | – | 5 | 6 | – | 5 |
| Wayne State (NE) | 5 | – | 5 | 6 | – | 5 |
| SW Minnesota State | 3 | – | 7 | 4 | – | 7 |
| Upper Iowa | 2 | – | 8 | 2 | – | 9 |
$ – Conference champion; ^ – NCAA Division II playoff participant; # – Mineral Water Bowl participant; Rankings from AFCA Poll

2011 Northern Sun Intercollegiate Conference football standings
| | Conf. | | | Overall |
| Team | W | | L | W | | L |
|---|---|---|---|---|---|---|
North
| No. 6 Minnesota–Duluth +^ | 8 | – | 2 | 11 | – | 3 |
| No. 17 St. Cloud State +^ | 8 | – | 2 | 9 | – | 3 |
| Bemidji State | 7 | – | 3 | 8 | – | 3 |
| Mary | 4 | – | 6 | 5 | – | 6 |
| Northern State | 4 | – | 6 | 5 | – | 6 |
| MSU Moorhead | 1 | – | 9 | 2 | – | 9 |
| Minnesota–Crookston | 0 | – | 10 | 1 | – | 10 |
South
| Minnesota State # + | 8 | – | 2 | 9 | – | 3 |
| Wayne State (NE) | 7 | – | 3 | 7 | – | 4 |
| Winona State | 7 | – | 3 | 7 | – | 4 |
| Augustana (SD) | 6 | – | 4 | 6 | – | 5 |
| Concordia–St. Paul | 5 | – | 5 | 6 | – | 5 |
| SW Minnesota State | 3 | – | 7 | 3 | – | 8 |
| Upper Iowa | 2 | – | 8 | 3 | – | 8 |
+ – Conference co-champions; ^ – NCAA Division II playoff participant; # – Mineral Water Bowl participant; Rankings from AFCA Poll

2012 Northern Sun Intercollegiate Conference football standings
| | Conf. | | | Overall |
| Team | W | | L | W | | L |
|---|---|---|---|---|---|---|
North
| No. 12 Minnesota–Duluth ^ | 10 | – | 1 | 10 | – | 2 |
| Bemidji State | 7 | – | 4 | 7 | – | 4 |
| St. Cloud State | 7 | – | 4 | 7 | – | 4 |
| Northern State | 6 | – | 5 | 6 | – | 5 |
| Mary | 4 | – | 7 | 4 | – | 7 |
| Minot State | 3 | – | 8 | 3 | – | 8 |
| Minnesota–Crookston | 2 | – | 9 | 2 | – | 9 |
| MSU Moorhead | 1 | – | 10 | 1 | – | 10 |
South
| No. 3 Minnesota State $^ | 11 | – | 0 | 13 | – | 1 |
| Winona State # | 9 | – | 2 | 10 | – | 2 |
| Sioux Falls | 9 | – | 2 | 9 | – | 2 |
| Wayne State (NE) | 6 | – | 5 | 6 | – | 5 |
| Augustana (SD) | 5 | – | 6 | 5 | – | 6 |
| SW Minnesota State | 4 | – | 7 | 4 | – | 7 |
| Concordia–St. Paul | 2 | – | 9 | 2 | – | 9 |
| Upper Iowa | 2 | – | 9 | 2 | – | 9 |
$ – Conference champion; ^ – NCAA Division II playoff participant; # – Mineral Water Bowl participant; Rankings from AFCA Poll

2013 Northern Sun Intercollegiate Conference football standings
| | Conf. | | | Overall |
| Team | W | | L | W | | L |
|---|---|---|---|---|---|---|
North
| No. 8 Minnesota–Duluth ^ | 10 | – | 1 | 11 | – | 2 |
| No. 5 St. Cloud State ^ | 10 | – | 1 | 12 | – | 2 |
| Mary | 6 | – | 5 | 6 | – | 5 |
| MSU Moorhead | 4 | – | 7 | 4 | – | 7 |
| Northern State | 4 | – | 7 | 4 | – | 7 |
| Minnesota–Crookston | 2 | – | 9 | 2 | – | 9 |
| Bemidji State | 3 | – | 8 | 3 | – | 8 |
| Minot State | 2 | – | 9 | 2 | – | 9 |
South
| No. 6 Minnesota State $^ | 11 | – | 0 | 11 | – | 1 |
| SW Minnesota State # | 7 | – | 4 | 7 | – | 5 |
| Winona State | 6 | – | 5 | 6 | – | 5 |
| Sioux Falls | 6 | – | 5 | 6 | – | 5 |
| Upper Iowa | 6 | – | 5 | 6 | – | 5 |
| Concordia–St. Paul | 5 | – | 6 | 5 | – | 6 |
| Augustana (SD) | 4 | – | 7 | 4 | – | 7 |
| Wayne State (NE) | 2 | – | 9 | 2 | – | 9 |
$ – Conference champion; ^ – NCAA Division II playoff participant; # – Mineral Water Bowl participant; Rankings from AFCA Poll

2014 Northern Sun Intercollegiate Conference football standings
| | Conf. | | | Overall |
| Team | W | | L | W | | L |
|---|---|---|---|---|---|---|
North
| No. 3 Minnesota–Duluth +^ | 11 | – | 0 | 13 | – | 1 |
| Northern State | 8 | – | 3 | 8 | – | 3 |
| St. Cloud State | 6 | – | 5 | 6 | – | 5 |
| Mary | 5 | – | 6 | 5 | – | 6 |
| MSU Moorhead | 4 | – | 7 | 4 | – | 7 |
| Bemidji State | 3 | – | 8 | 3 | – | 8 |
| Minot State | 1 | – | 10 | 1 | – | 10 |
| Minnesota–Crookston | 0 | – | 11 | 0 | – | 11 |
South
| No. 2 Minnesota State +^ | 11 | – | 0 | 14 | – | 1 |
| No. 18 Sioux Falls # | 10 | – | 1 | 11 | – | 1 |
| Concordia–St. Paul | 5 | – | 6 | 5 | – | 6 |
| Augustana (SD) | 6 | – | 5 | 6 | – | 5 |
| Wayne State (NE) | 5 | – | 6 | 5 | – | 6 |
| Upper Iowa | 6 | – | 5 | 6 | – | 5 |
| SW Minnesota State | 3 | – | 8 | 3 | – | 8 |
| Winona State | 4 | – | 7 | 4 | – | 7 |
+ – Conference co-champions; ^ – NCAA Division II playoff participant; # – Mineral Water Bowl participant; Rankings from AFCA Poll

2015 Northern Sun Intercollegiate Conference football standings
| | Conf. | | | Overall |
| Team | W | | L | W | | L |
|---|---|---|---|---|---|---|
North
| Minnesota–Duluth # | 8 | – | 3 | 9 | – | 3 |
| Bemidji State | 7 | – | 4 | 7 | – | 4 |
| Northern State | 6 | – | 5 | 6 | – | 5 |
| St. Cloud State | 6 | – | 5 | 6 | – | 5 |
| MSU Moorhead | 6 | – | 5 | 6 | – | 5 |
| Minot State | 1 | – | 10 | 1 | – | 10 |
| Mary | 1 | – | 10 | 1 | – | 10 |
| Minnesota–Crookston | 1 | – | 10 | 1 | – | 10 |
South
| No. 13 Minnesota State $^ | 10 | – | 1 | 10 | – | 2 |
| No. 24 Augustana (SD) ^ | 9 | – | 2 | 9 | – | 3 |
| No. 22 Sioux Falls ^ | 9 | – | 2 | 9 | – | 3 |
| SW Minnesota State | 8 | – | 3 | 8 | – | 3 |
| Upper Iowa | 6 | – | 5 | 6 | – | 5 |
| Winona State | 5 | – | 6 | 5 | – | 6 |
| Wayne State (NE) | 4 | – | 7 | 4 | – | 7 |
| Concordia–St. Paul | 1 | – | 10 | 1 | – | 10 |
$ – Conference champion; ^ – NCAA Division II playoff participant; # – Mineral Water Bowl participant; Rankings from AFCA Poll

2016 Northern Sun Intercollegiate Conference football standings
| | Conf. | | | Overall |
| Team | W | | L | W | | L |
|---|---|---|---|---|---|---|
North
| No. 14 Minnesota–Duluth ^ | 10 | – | 1 | 10 | – | 2 |
| Bemidji State # | 8 | – | 3 | 9 | – | 3 |
| MSU Moorhead | 7 | – | 4 | 7 | – | 4 |
| Northern State | 6 | – | 5 | 6 | – | 5 |
| St. Cloud State | 5 | – | 6 | 5 | – | 6 |
| Minot State | 3 | – | 8 | 3 | – | 8 |
| Mary | 1 | – | 10 | 1 | – | 10 |
| Minnesota–Crookston | 0 | – | 11 | 0 | – | 11 |
South
| No. 8 Sioux Falls $^ | 11 | – | 0 | 12 | – | 1 |
| Augustana (SD) | 8 | – | 3 | 8 | – | 3 |
| Minnesota State | 8 | – | 3 | 8 | – | 3 |
| Winona State | 8 | – | 3 | 8 | – | 3 |
| SW Minnesota State | 5 | – | 6 | 5 | – | 6 |
| Upper Iowa | 3 | – | 8 | 3 | – | 8 |
| Wayne State (NE) | 3 | – | 8 | 3 | – | 8 |
| Concordia–St. Paul | 2 | – | 9 | 2 | – | 9 |
$ – Conference champion; ^ – NCAA Division II playoff participant; # – Mineral Water Bowl participant; Rankings from AFCA Poll

2017 Northern Sun Intercollegiate Conference football standings
| | Conf. | | | Overall |
| Team | W | | L | W | | L |
|---|---|---|---|---|---|---|
North
| Minnesota–Duluth # | 9 | – | 2 | 9 | – | 3 |
| Bemidji State | 8 | – | 3 | 8 | – | 3 |
| Northern State | 6 | – | 5 | 6 | – | 5 |
| St. Cloud State | 6 | – | 5 | 6 | – | 5 |
| MSU Moorhead | 5 | – | 6 | 5 | – | 6 |
| Minot State | 3 | – | 8 | 3 | – | 8 |
| Mary | 1 | – | 10 | 1 | – | 10 |
| Minnesota–Crookston | 0 | – | 11 | 0 | – | 11 |
South
| No. 4 Minnesota State $^ | 11 | – | 0 | 13 | – | 1 |
| No. 15 Winona State ^ | 10 | – | 1 | 10 | – | 2 |
| No. 20 Sioux Falls ^ | 9 | – | 2 | 9 | – | 3 |
| Upper Iowa | 6 | – | 5 | 6 | – | 5 |
| Wayne State (NE) | 6 | – | 5 | 6 | – | 5 |
| Augustana (SD) | 4 | – | 7 | 4 | – | 7 |
| Concordia–St. Paul | 2 | – | 9 | 2 | – | 9 |
| SW Minnesota State | 2 | – | 9 | 2 | – | 9 |
$ – Conference champion; ^ – NCAA Division II playoff participant; # – Mineral Water Bowl participant; Rankings from AFCA Poll

2018 Northern Sun Intercollegiate Conference football standings
| | Conf. | | | Overall |
| Team | W | | L | W | | L |
|---|---|---|---|---|---|---|
North
| No. 13 Minnesota–Duluth +^ | 11 | – | 0 | 11 | – | 1 |
| MSU Moorhead # | 8 | – | 3 | 8 | – | 4 |
| Bemidji State | 7 | – | 4 | 7 | – | 4 |
| St. Cloud State | 7 | – | 4 | 7 | – | 4 |
| Northern State | 4 | – | 7 | 4 | – | 7 |
| Minnesota–Crookston | 1 | – | 10 | 1 | – | 10 |
| Minot State | 1 | – | 10 | 1 | – | 10 |
| Mary | 1 | – | 10 | 1 | – | 10 |
South
| No. 3 Minnesota State +^ | 11 | – | 0 | 13 | – | 1 |
| Winona State | 8 | – | 3 | 8 | – | 3 |
| Sioux Falls | 7 | – | 4 | 7 | – | 4 |
| Augustana (SD) | 7 | – | 4 | 7 | – | 4 |
| Concordia–St. Paul | 5 | – | 6 | 5 | – | 6 |
| SW Minnesota State | 4 | – | 7 | 4 | – | 7 |
| Wayne State (NE) | 3 | – | 8 | 3 | – | 8 |
| Upper Iowa | 3 | – | 8 | 3 | – | 8 |
+ – Conference co-champions; ^ – NCAA Division II playoff participant; # – Mineral Water Bowl participant; Rankings from AFCA Poll

2019 Northern Sun Intercollegiate Conference football standings
| | Conf. | | | Overall |
| Team | W | | L | W | | L |
|---|---|---|---|---|---|---|
North
| Bemidji State | 8 | – | 3 | 8 | – | 3 |
| Minnesota–Duluth | 8 | – | 3 | 8 | – | 3 |
| MSU Moorhead | 6 | – | 5 | 6 | – | 5 |
| Northern State | 6 | – | 5 | 6 | – | 5 |
| St. Cloud State | 4 | – | 7 | 4 | – | 7 |
| Minot State | 3 | – | 8 | 3 | – | 8 |
| Mary | 2 | – | 9 | 2 | – | 9 |
| Minnesota–Crookston | 0 | – | 11 | 0 | – | 11 |
South
| No. 2 Minnesota State $^ | 11 | – | 0 | 14 | – | 1 |
| Augustana (SD) ^ | 9 | – | 2 | 9 | – | 3 |
| Sioux Falls ^ | 8 | – | 3 | 8 | – | 4 |
| Winona State # | 8 | – | 3 | 8 | – | 4 |
| Concordia–St. Paul | 6 | – | 5 | 6 | – | 5 |
| Wayne State (NE) | 4 | – | 7 | 4 | – | 7 |
| SW Minnesota State | 3 | – | 8 | 3 | – | 8 |
| Upper Iowa | 2 | – | 9 | 2 | – | 9 |
$ – Conference champion; ^ – NCAA Division II playoff participant; # – Mineral Water Bowl participant; Rankings from AFCA Poll
