= 2010 Minnesota–Duluth Bulldogs football team =

American college football season

2010 Minnesota Duluth Bulldogs football

NCAA Division II champion NSIC champion

NCAA Division II Championship Game, W 20–17 vs. Delta State
- Conference: Northern Sun Intercollegiate Conference

Ranking
- AFCA: No. 1
- Record: 15–0 (10–0 NSIC)
- Head coach: Bob Nielson (8th season)
- Captain: Kiel Fechtelkotter
- Home stadium: James S. Malosky Stadium

2010 Northern Sun Intercollegiate Conference football standings
	Conf.			Overall
Team	W		L	W		L
North Division
No. 1 Minnesota–Duluth $^	10	–	0	15	–	0
No. 12 St. Cloud State ^	9	–	1	10	–	3
Bemidji State	6	–	4	7	–	4
Mary	4	–	6	4	–	7
Minnesota State–Moorhead	2	–	8	2	–	9
Northern State	2	–	8	2	–	9
Minnesota–Crookston	0	–	10	1	–	10
South Division
No. 6 Augustana (SD) ^	9	–	1	11	–	2
Concordia–St. Paul #	7	–	3	8	–	4
Winona State	6	–	4	7	–	4
Minnesota State	5	–	5	6	–	5
Wayne State (NE)	5	–	5	6	–	5
SW Minnesota State	3	–	7	4	–	7
Upper Iowa	2	–	8	2	–	9
$ – Conference champion; ^ – NCAA Division II playoff participant; # – Mineral Water Bowl participant; Rankings from AFCA poll

The 2010 Minnesota–Duluth Bulldogs football team was an American football team that won the 2010 NCAA Division II national championship. The team was the first in NCAA Division II history to twice compile a perfect 15–0 record.

The team represented the University of Minnesota Duluth in the Northern Sun Intercollegiate Conference (NSIC) during the 2010 NCAA Division II football season. In their eighth season under head coach Bob Nielson, the Bulldogs compiled a perfect 15–0 record, outscored opponents by a total of 595 to 190, and won the NSIC championship.

The team advanced to the NCAA Division II playoffs and won the national championship by defeating Delta State, 20–17, in the championship game. The Bulldogs won on a 32-yard field goal by David Nadeau as time expired.

Kiel Fechtelkotter was the team captain. Assistant coaches included Curt Wiese (offensive coordinator), Peter Lue, and Mike McHugh.

The team's statistical leaders included Brad Foss with 1,151 rushing yards, Chase Vogler with 1,913 passing yards and 2,818 yards of total offense, D.J. Winfield with 990 receiving yards, Isaac Odim with 19 touchdowns, and David Nadeau with 119 points scored.

The team played its home games at James S. Malosky Stadium in Duluth, Minnesota.

== Schedule ==
Date	Opponent	Rank	Site	Result	Attendance	Source
August 28	at No. 5 Central Washington*	No. 4	Tomlinson Stadium; Ellensburg, WA	W 35–10	3,973	
September 11	at Upper Iowa	No. 2	Eischeid Stadium; Fayette, IA	W 62–10	902	
September 18	No. 18 Wayne State (NE)	No. 2	Malosky Stadium; Duluth, MN	W 42–10	4,607	
September 25	Bemidji State	No. 2	Malosky Stadium; Duluth, MN	W 44–21	4,474	
October 2	at Minnesota State–Moorhead	No. 2	Alex Nemzek Stadium; Moorhead, MN	W 56–7	677	
October 9	Winona State	No. 2	Malosky Stadium; Duluth, MN	W 59–17	4,418	
October 16	Mary	No. 2	Malosky Stadium; Duluth, MN	W 49–17	4,545	
October 23	at Northern State	No. 2	Swisher Field; Aberdeen, SD	W 27–7	313	
October 30	No. 20 St. Cloud State	No. 2	Malosky Stadium; Duluth, MN	W 40–17	4,032	
November 6	at Minnesota–Crookston	No. 1	Ed Widseth Field; Crookston, MN	W 55–7	455	
November 14	at Minnesota State	No. 1	Regional Events Center; Marshall, MN	W 45–21	438	
November 27	No. 15 St. Cloud State*	No. 1	Malosky Stadium; Duluth, MN (NCAA Division II second round)	W 20–17 ^{OT}	2,122	
December 4	No. 9 Augustana (SD)*	No. 1	Malosky Stadium; Duluth, MN (NCAA Division II quarterfinal)	W 24–13	3,083	
December 11	No. 3 Northwest Missouri State*	No. 1	Malosky Stadium; Duluth, MN (NCAA Division II semifinal)	W 17–13	3,627	
December 18	vs. Delta State*	No. 1	Braly Municipal Stadium; Florence, AL (NCAA Division II championship game)	W 20–17	4,027	
*Non-conference game; Rankings from AFCA Poll released prior to the game
