= 2008 Minnesota–Duluth Bulldogs football team =

American college football season

2008 Minnesota Duluth Bulldogs football

NCAA Division II champion NSIC champion

NCAA Division II Championship Game, W 21–14 vs. Northwest Missouri State
- Conference: Northern Sun Intercollegiate Conference

Ranking
- AFCA: No. 1
- Record: 15–0 (10–0 NSIC)
- Head coach: Bob Nielson (6th season)
- Home stadium: Malosky Stadium

2008 Northern Sun Intercollegiate Conference football standings
	Conf.			Overall
Team	W		L	W		L
North Division
No. 1 Minnesota–Duluth $^	10	–	0	15	–	0
St. Cloud State	7	–	3	7	–	4
Bemidji State	4	–	6	5	–	6
Mary	4	–	6	4	–	7
Minnesota State–Moorhead	2	–	8	2	–	9
Minnesota–Crookston	1	–	9	2	–	9
Northern State	1	–	9	1	–	10
South Division
No. 23 Minnesota State ^	9	–	1	9	–	3
No. 19 Wayne State (NE) ^	8	–	2	9	–	3
Augustana (SD) #	7	–	3	8	–	4
SW Minnesota State	6	–	4	6	–	5
Winona State	6	–	4	6	–	5
Concordia–St. Paul	3	–	7	4	–	7
Upper Iowa	2	–	8	2	–	9
$ – Conference champion; ^ – NCAA Division II playoff participant; # – Mineral Water Bowl participant; Rankings from AFCA Poll

The 2008 Minnesota–Duluth Bulldogs football team was an American football team that won the 2008 NCAA Division II national championship.

The team represented the University of Minnesota Duluth in the Northern Sun Intercollegiate Conference (NSIC) during the 2008 NCAA Division II football season. In their sixth, non-consecutive season under head coach Bob Nielson, the Bulldogs compiled a perfect 15–0 record, outscored opponents by a total of 613 to 173, and won the NSIC championship. The team advanced to the playoffs and won the national championship by defeating Northwest Missouri State in the championship game.

The team's statistical leaders included Isaac Odim with 1,638 rushing yards and 180 points scored, Ted Schlafke with 3,018 passing yards and 3,513 yards of total offense, and D.J. Winfield with 1,201 receiving yards.

The team played its home games at James S. Malosky Stadium in Duluth, Minnesota.

== Schedule ==
Date	Opponent	Rank	Site	Result	Attendance	Source
August 30	at Concordia–St. Paul	No. 22	James Griffin Stadium; Saint Paul, MN	W 40–0	2,253	
September 6	at Missouri Western*	No. 17	Spratt Stadium; St. Joseph, MO	W 47–18	4,001	
September 11	Southwest Minnesota State	No. 15	Malosky Stadium; Duluth, MN	W 43–21	4,460	
September 20	at Augustana (SD)	No. 15	Howard Wood Field; Sioux Falls, SD	W 40–10	3,526	
September 27	Mary	No. 15	Malosky Stadium; Duluth, MN	W 44–7	1,707	
October 4	at Minnesota State–Moorhead	No. 10	Alex Nemzek Stadium; Moorhead, MN	W 52–10	2,200	
October 11	Northern State	No. 9	Malosky Stadium; Duluth, MN	W 55–7	3,808	
October 18	at St. Cloud State	No. 9	Husky Stadium; St. Cloud, MN	W 38–21	5,102	
October 25	Bemidji State	No. T–6	Malosky Stadium; Duluth, MN	W 48–21	3,111	
November 1	at Minnesota–Crookston	No. 8	Ed Widseth Field; Crookston, MN	W 63–7	473	
November 8	Winona State	No. 5	Malosky Stadium; Duluth, MN	W 38–7	1,011	
November 22	No. 12 Chadron State*	No. 5	Malosky Stadium; Duluth, MN (NCAA Division II first round)	W 20–10	1,468	
November 29	at No. 1 Grand Valley State*	No. 5	Lubbers Stadium; Allendale, MI (NCAA Division II quarterfinal)	W 19–13	3,548	
December 6	at No. 7 California (PA)*	No. 5	Adamson Stadium; California, PA (NCAA Division II semifinal)	W 45–7	3,200	
December 13	vs. No. 3 Northwest Missouri State*	No. 5	Braly Municipal Stadium; Florence, AL (NCAA Division II Championship Game)	W 21–14	6,219	
*Non-conference game; Rankings from American Football Coaches Association Poll released prior to the game
