= 2008 NCAA Division II Football Championship Game =

2008 NCAA Division II Football Championship
Minnesota–Duluth Bulldogs	Northwest Missouri State Bearcats
(14–0)	(13–1)
21	14
Head coach: Bob Nielson	Head coach: Mel Tjeerdsma
	1	2	3	4	Total
Minnesota–Duluth	0	7	7	7	21
Northwest Missouri State	0	0	0	14	14
- Date: December 13, 2008
- Stadium: Braly Municipal Stadium
- Location: Florence, Alabama
- Attendance: 6,219

United States TV coverage
- Network: ESPN2

The 2008 NCAA Division II Football Championship Game was held on December 13, 2008 at Braly Municipal Stadium near the campus of the University of North Alabama in Florence, Alabama.

== Teams ==
The 2008 NCAA Division II National Football Championship playoffs involved 24 schools playing in a single-elimination tournament to determine the national champion of NCAA Division II college football.

The tournament began on November 15, 2008, and concluded on December 13, 2008 at Braly Municipal Stadium near the campus of the University of North Alabama in Florence, Alabama.

== Game summary ==
The Minnesota Duluth Bulldogs won the school's first NCAA Division II football championship in a 21-14 win over the Northwest Missouri State Bearcats. Minnesota Duluth's quarterback Ted Schlafke threw 38-yard touchdown pass to Tony Doherty with 14 seconds left in the second quarter to give the Bulldogs a 7-0 lead. Later he threw a 5-yard touchdown midway through the third quarter to Issac Odim for a 14-0 lead. Odim ran for a 4-yard touchdown early in the fourth quarter for a 21-0 lead. Northwest Missouri's first score came on a 44-yard interception return by Aldwin Foster-Rettig cutting the score to 21-7. The Bearcats cut the lead to 21-14 as Raphael Robinson scored on a 2-yard touchdown catch with 1:36 left in the game. Minnesota Duluth recovered an onside kick attempt and ran out the clock.

Minnesota Duluth finished the season with a 15-0 record. Northwest Missouri ended the season with a 13-2 record and suffered its fourth consecutive loss in the Division II championship game.

=== Starting lineups ===
Minn-Duluth	Position	Northwest Mo. St.
OFFENSE
	WR	
	LT	
	LG	
	C	
	RG	
	RT	
	TE	
	WR	
	QB	
	RB	
	TE	
DEFENSE
	LE	
	LDT/NT	
	RDT/RE	
	RE/LOLB	
	LOLB/MLB	
	MLB/ROLB	
	ROLB/DB	
	LCB	
	RCB	
	SS	
	FS	

=== Scoring summary ===
- 1st Quarter
  - No scoring.
- 2nd Quarter
  - Minnesota Duluth - Tony Doherty 38 yard pass from Ted Schlafke (David Nadeau kick), 0:14 Bulldogs 7-0
    Drive: 6 plays, 75 yds, 1:03
- 3rd Quarter
  - Minnesota Duluth - Isaac Odim 5 yard pass from Ted Schlafke (David Nadeau kick), 6:32 Bulldogs 14-0
    Drive: 9 plays, 31 yds, 5:13
- 4th Quarter
  - Minnesota Duluth - Isaac Odim 4 yard run (David Nadeau kick), 13:43 Bulldogs 21-0
    Drive: 7 plays, 54 yds, 3:06
  - NW Missouri St - Aldwin Foster-Rettig 44 yard interception return TD (Tommy Frevert kick), 8:03. Bulldogs 21-7
  - NW Missouri St - Raphael Robinson 2 yard pass (Tommy Frevert kick), 1:36. Bulldogs 21-14
    Drive: 10 plays, 85 yds, 3:23

=== Statistical comparison ===
	Minn-Duluth	Northwest Mo. St.
First downs	17	19
Third down efficiency	6-15	6-12
Fourth down efficiency	1-1	0-0
Total yards		
Passing yards	128	189
Passing – completions/attempts	14/23	18/30
Rushing yards	145	106
Rushing attempts	43	32
Yards per rush		
Penalties-yards	1-12	3-30
Sacks against-yards	4-16	6-32
Fumbles-lost	0-0	6-2
Interceptions thrown	2	2
Time of possession	34:18	25:42

Source: "NCAA Game Summary - Northwest Mo. St. vs. Minn.-Duluth Game". NCAA. December 13, 2008.
