= Chuck Martin (American football) =

American football player and coach (born 1968)

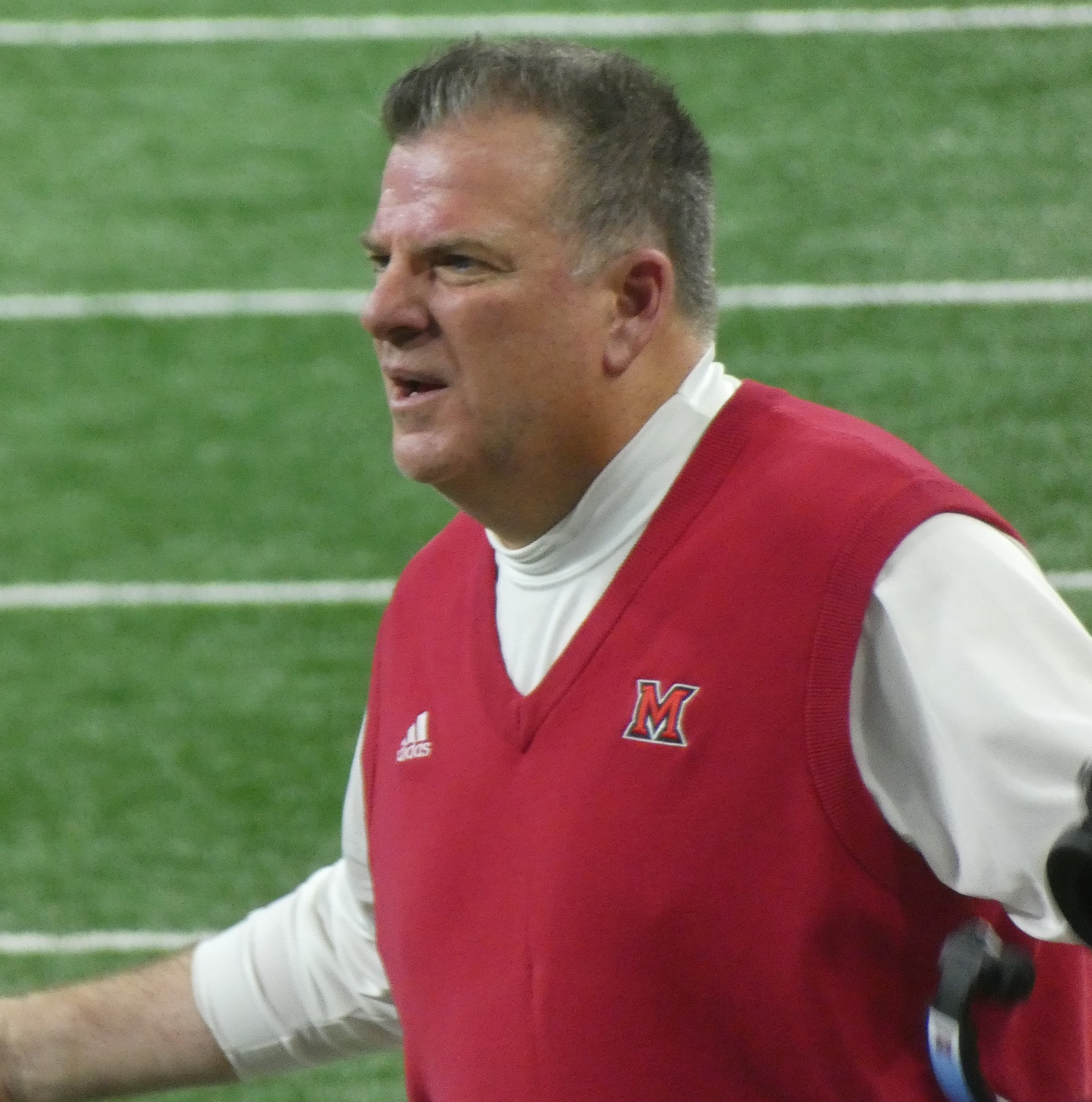
- Martin with Miami (OH) in 2023

Current position
- Title: Head coach
- Team: Miami (OH)
- Conference: MAC
- Record: 79–78

Biographical details
- Born: January 8, 1968 (age 58); Park Forest, Illinois, U.S.

Playing career

Football
- 1987–1989: Millikin

Basketball
- 1986–1990: Millikin
- Positions: Safety, placekicker (football); Guard (basketball)

Coaching career (HC unless noted)
- 1992–1993: Mankato State (GA)
- 1994–1995: Wittenberg (LB)
- 1996–1997: Millikin (DC/DB)
- 1998–1999: Eastern Michigan (LB)
- 2000–2002: Grand Valley State (DB/OLB)
- 2003: Grand Valley State (DC/DB)
- 2004–2009: Grand Valley State
- 2010: Notre Dame (DB/RC)
- 2011: Notre Dame (S/RC)
- 2012–2013: Notre Dame (OC/QB)
- 2014–present: Miami (OH)

Head coaching record
- Overall: 153–85
- Bowls: 2–5
- Tournaments: 16–4 (NCAA D-II playoffs)

Accomplishments and honors

Championships
- 2 NCAA Division II (2005–2006); 5 GLIAC (2005–2009); 3 MAC East Division (2016, 2019, 2023); 2 MAC (2019, 2023)

Awards
- 2× AFCA Division II Coach of the Year (2005–2006); GLIAC Coach of the Year (2007)

Charles Thomas Martin (born January 8, 1968) is an American college football coach and former player. He is the head football coach at Miami University in Oxford, Ohio, a position he has held since the 2014 season. Martin was the head football coach at Grand Valley State University in Allendale, Michigan from 2004 to 2009, compiling a record of 74–7. His Grand Valley State Lakers won consecutive NCAA Division II Football Championships in 2005 and 2006 and were runners-up in 2009. Martin was the offensive coordinator at the University of Notre Dame from 2012 to 2013.

== Early life and education ==
Born and raised in Park Forest, Illinois in an Irish Catholic family, Martin graduated from Rich East High School in 1986. Martin attended Millikin University, an NCAA Division III school, and played both football and basketball. On the football team, Martin earned All-American honors as a safety and all-conference honors as a placekicker. Martin played at guard on the Millikin basketball team and averaged 9.6 points, 6.2 rebounds, and 4.2 assists as a senior.

== Coaching career ==
From 2005 to 2009, Martin's Lakers football team only lost one regular season game (Hillsdale College, 2009), and only lost two post-season games at the end of the 2007 and 2008 seasons, setting a record for consecutive wins, 48, breaking the previous mark of 29 games also set by the Lakers spanning from 2000 to 2003 by then head coach, Brian Kelly.

From 2005 to 2007, the Lakers under Martin set an all-time NCAA Division II record with 40 consecutive wins, breaking a half-century old mark set by in-state and in-conference rival Hillsdale College.

Martin was the offensive coordinator at Notre Dame for the 2012 season, where the Fighting Irish finished the regular season with a 12–0 record and a berth in the BCS National Championship Game.

On December 3, 2013, it was announced that Martin would be leaving his position at Notre Dame to take over as the head coach at Miami University. In 2019, He won his first MAC championship with an upset win over Central Michigan in the MAC Championship. In 2023, Miami won the East division with a 7-1 conference record with their only loss coming against West champion Toledo. On October 21, during the regular season game between the division winners, Miami quarterback Brett Gabbert suffered a season ending leg injury. In spite of that, Miami won their first MAC Championship since 2019 with a 23–14 upset victory in the MAC Championship Game.

== Head coaching record ==
| Year | Team | Overall | Conference | Standing | Bowl/playoffs | Coaches^{#} | AP^{°} |
|---|---|---|---|---|---|---|---|
Grand Valley State Lakers (Great Lakes Intercollegiate Athletic Conference) (2004–2009)
| 2004 | Grand Valley State | 10–3 | 8–2 | 3rd | L NCAA Division II Quarterfinal | 25 | |
| 2005 | Grand Valley State | 13–0 | 9–0 | 1st | W NCAA Division II Championship | 1 | |
| 2006 | Grand Valley State | 15–0 | 10–0 | 1st | W NCAA Division II Championship | 1 | |
| 2007 | Grand Valley State | 12–1 | 9–0 | 1st | L NCAA Division II Semifinal | 4 | |
| 2008 | Grand Valley State | 11–1 | 10–0 | 1st | L NCAA Division II Quarterfinal | 4 | |
| 2009 | Grand Valley State | 13–2 | 9–1 | 1st | L NCAA Division II Championship | 2 | |
| Grand Valley State: | | 74–7 | 55–3 | | | | |
Miami RedHawks (Mid-American Conference) (2014–present)
| 2014 | Miami | 2–10 | 2–6 | 6th (East) | | | |
| 2015 | Miami | 3–9 | 2–6 | T–5th (East) | | | |
| 2016 | Miami | 6–7 | 6–2 | T–1st (East) | L St. Petersburg | | |
| 2017 | Miami | 5–7 | 4–4 | T–3rd (East) | | | |
| 2018 | Miami | 6–6 | 6–2 | T–2nd (East) | | | |
| 2019 | Miami | 8–6 | 6–2 | 1st (East) | L LendingTree | | |
| 2020 | Miami | 2–1 | 2–1 | T–3rd (East) | | | |
| 2021 | Miami | 7–6 | 5–3 | 2nd (East) | W Frisco Football Classic | | |
| 2022 | Miami | 6–7 | 4–4 | T–4th (East) | L Bahamas | | |
| 2023 | Miami | 11–3 | 7–1 | 1st (East) | L Cure | | |
| 2024 | Miami | 9–5 | 7–1 | T–1st | W Arizona | | |
| 2025 | Miami | 7–7 | 6–2 | T–2nd | L Arizona | | |
| 2026 | Miami | 7–4 | 5-2 | | | | |
| Miami: | | 79–78 | 62–36 | | | | |
| Total: | | 153–85 | | | | | |
National championship Conference title Conference division title or championship game berth
