= Grand Valley State Lakers football, 2000–2009 =

American college football season

2000–2009 Grand Valley State Lakers football
- Conference: Great Lakes Intercollegiate Athletic Conference
- Head coach: Brian Kelly (1991–2003); Chuck Martin (2004–2009)
- Home stadium: Lubbers Stadium (2010–2019)

The Grand Valley State Lakers football program, 2000–2009 represented Grand Valley State University (GVSU) during the 2000s in NCAA Division II college football as a member of the Great Lakes Intercollegiate Athletic Conference (GLIAC). The team was led by head coaches Brian Kelly (1991–2003) and Chuck Martin (2004–2009). During the 2000s, the Lakers advanced to the NCAA Division II playoffs nine consecutive years from 2001 to 2009, won seven GLIAC championships, played in six NCAA Division II championship games, and won four national championships (2002, 2003, 2005, and 2006).

The team played its home games at Lubbers Stadium, named after former university president Arend Lubbers, located on GVSU's main campus in Allendale, Michigan.

== 2000 ==
2000 Grand Valley State Lakers football
- Conference: Great Lakes Intercollegiate Athletic Conference
- Record: 7–4 (7–3 GLIAC)
- Head coach: Brian Kelly (10th season)
- Home stadium: Lubbers Stadium

2000 Great Lakes Intercollegiate Athletic Conference football standings
	Conf.			Overall
Team	W		L	W		L
No. 2 Northwood +^	9	–	1	10	–	2
No. 4 Saginaw Valley State +^	9	–	1	9	–	3
Grand Valley State	7	–	3	7	–	4
Northern Michigan	6	–	4	6	–	5
Ashland	5	–	5	6	–	5
Michigan Tech	5	–	5	5	–	5
Ferris State	5	–	5	5	–	6
Wayne State (MI)	4	–	6	4	–	6
Mercyhurst	4	–	6	4	–	7
Hillsdale	2	–	8	3	–	8
Indianapolis	2	–	8	3	–	8
Findlay	2	–	8	2	–	8
+ – Conference co-champions; ^ – NCAA Division II playoff participant; Rankings from AFCA Northeast Region poll

The 2000 Grand Valley State Lakers football team represented Grand Valley State University (GVSU) as a member of the Great Lakes Intercollegiate Athletic Conference (GLIAC) during the 2000 NCAA Division II football season. In their tenth year under head coach Brian Kelly, the Lakers compiled an 7–4 record (7–3 in conference games), finished in third place in the GLIAC, and outscored opponents by a total of 337 to 284.

=== Schedule ===
Date	Opponent	Site	Result	Attendance	Source
September 2	at No. 17 South Dakota State*	Couglin-Alumni Stadium; Brookings, SD	L 27–36	3,011	
September 9	at Saginaw Valley State	Wickes Stadium; University Center, MI (Battle of the Valleys)	L 21–28	3,700	
September 16	No. 15 Northwood	Lubbers Stadium; Allendale, MI	L 17–45	8,951	
September 23	Ashland	Lubbers Stadium; Allendale, MI	W 38–7	4,653	
September 30	at No. 7 (Northeast) Northern Michigan	Superior Dome; Marquette, MI	L 28–29	2,546	
October 7	Ferris State	Lubbers Stadium; Allendale, MI (Anchor–Bone Classic)	W 21–20	5,073	
October 14	Indianapolis	Lubbers Stadium; Allendale, MI	W 56–21	5,452	
October 21	at Mercyhurst	Tullio Field; Erie, PA	W 45–20	1,750	
October 28	Michigan Tech	Lubbers Stadium; Allendale, MI	W 31–29	6,026	
November 4	at Wayne State (MI)	Tom Adams Field; Detroit, MI	W 22–20	1,680	
November 11	at Hillsdale	Frank "Muddy" Waters Stadium; Hillsdale, MI	W 31–29	1,347	
*Non-conference game; Rankings from American Football Coaches Association Poll released prior to the game

== 2001 ==
2001 Grand Valley State Lakers football

NCAA Division II runner-up GLIAC champion

NCAA Division II Championship Game, L 14–17 vs. North Dakota
- Conference: Great Lakes Intercollegiate Athletic Conference
- Record: 13–1 (9–0 GLIAC)
- Head coach: Brian Kelly (11th season)
- Offensive coordinator: Jeff Quinn (13th season)
- Defensive coordinator: John Jancek (3rd season)
- Home stadium: Lubbers Stadium

2001 Great Lakes Intercollegiate Athletic Conference football standings
	Conf.			Overall
Team	W		L	W		L
No. 2 Grand Valley State $^	9	–	0	13	–	1
No. 6 Saginaw Valley State ^	9	–	1	11	–	2
Ferris State	7	–	3	7	–	4
Indianapolis	6	–	4	7	–	4
Ashland	5	–	5	6	–	5
Michigan Tech	5	–	5	5	–	5
Northern Michigan	3	–	7	4	–	7
Northwood	3	–	6	3	–	6
Wayne State (MI)	3	–	6	3	–	7
Findlay	3	–	7	3	–	8
Hillsdale	3	–	7	3	–	8
Mercyhurst	2	–	7	2	–	7
$ – Conference champion; ^ – NCAA Division II playoff participant; Rankings from AFCA poll

The 2001 Grand Valley State Lakers football team that represented the Grand Valley State University in the Great Lakes Intercollegiate Athletic Conference (GLIAC) during the 2001 NCAA Division II football season. In their 11th season under head coach Brian Kelly, the Lakers compiled a 13–1 record (9–0 against conference opponents), outscored opponents by a total of 707 to 231, and won the GLIAC championship. The team qualified for the playoffs and advanced to the national championship game where they lost to North Dakota.

The team played its home games at Lubbers Stadium in Allendale Charter Township, Michigan.

=== Schedule ===
Date	Time	Opponent	Rank	Site	Result	Attendance	Source
August 30		Minnesota Crookston*	No. 22	Lubbers Stadium; Allendale, MI	W 56–0	4,952	
September 8		Saginaw Valley State	No. 18	Lubbers Stadium; Allendale, MI	W 38–7	5,303	
September 22		at Ashland	No. 15	Jack Miller Stadium; Ashland, OH	W 63–19	2,000	
September 29		Northern Michigan	No. 15	Lubbers Stadium; Allendale, MI	W 64–14	7,606	
October 6	1:30 p.m.	at Ferris State	No. 15	Top Taggart Field; Big Rapids, MI (Anchor–Bone Classic)	W 63–17	2,901	
October 13		at Indianapolis	No. 12	Key Stadium; Indianapolis, IN	W 63–27	3,000	
October 20		Mercyhurst	No. 7	Lubbers Stadium; Allendale, MI	W 59–3	8,057	
October 27		at Michigan Tech	No. 5	Sherman Field; Houghton, MI	W 44–34	888	
November 3		Wayne State (MI)	No. 4	Lubbers Stadium; Allendale, MI	W 77–12	3,766	
November 10		Hillsdale	No. 3	Lubbers Stadium; Allendale, MI	W 57–21	4,567	
November 17		No. 5 Bloomsburg*	No. 2	Lubbers Stadium; Allendale, MI (NCAA Division II first round)	W 42–14	4,858	
November 24		No. 9 Saginaw Valley State*	No. 2	Lubbers Stadium; Allendale, MI (NCAA Division II quarterfinal)	W 33–30	3,737	
December 1		No. 7 Catawba*	No. 2	Lubbers Stadium; Allendale, MI (NCAA Division II semifinal)	W 34–16	6,585	
December 8		vs. No. 4 North Dakota*	No. 2	Braly Municipal Stadium; Florence, AL (NCAA Division II Championship Game)	L 14–17	6,113	
*Non-conference game; Rankings from American Football Coaches Association Poll released prior to the game; All times are in Eastern time

== 2002 ==
2002 Grand Valley State Lakers football

NCAA Division II champion GLIAC champion

NCAA Division II Championship Game, W 31–24 vs. Valdosta State
- Conference: Great Lakes Intercollegiate Athletic Conference
- Record: 14–0 (9–0 GLIAC)
- Head coach: Brian Kelly (12th season)
- Offensive coordinator: Jeff Quinn (14th season)
- Defensive coordinator: John Jancek (4th season)
- Home stadium: Lubbers Stadium

2002 Great Lakes Intercollegiate Athletic Conference football standings
	Conf.			Overall
Team	W		L	W		L
No. 1 Grand Valley State $^	9	–	0	14	–	0
No. 25 Findlay	8	–	2	9	–	2
No. 13 Saginaw Valley State ^	8	–	2	9	–	3
Northwood	7	–	3	7	–	4
Northern Michigan	6	–	4	6	–	5
Ferris State	4	–	5	5	–	5
Indianapolis	4	–	6	5	–	6
Hillsdale	4	–	6	4	–	7
Michigan Tech	3	–	7	3	–	7
Wayne State (MI)	3	–	7	3	–	8
Ashland	2	–	8	2	–	9
Mercyhurst	1	–	9	2	–	9
$ – Conference champion; ^ – NCAA Division II playoff participant; Rankings from AFCA poll

The 2002 Grand Valley State Lakers football team was an American football team that won the 2002 NCAA Division II national championship.

The team represented the Grand Valley State University in the Great Lakes Intercollegiate Athletic Conference (GLIAC) during the 2002 NCAA Division II football season. In their 12th season under head coach Brian Kelly, the Lakers compiled a 14–0 record (9–0 against conference opponents), outscored opponents by a total of 654 to 231, and won the GLIAC championship. The team advanced to the playoffs and won the national championship by defeating Valdosta State in the championship game.

David Kirkus broke the school's single-season scoring records with 35 touchdowns and 212 points in 2002. The prior records had been set by Kirkus one year earlier. Reggie Spearman led the team with 1,500 rushing yards and 144 points (24 touchdowns) for Grand Valley in 2002. Terrance Banks also set a school single-season record with 98 receptions (good for 1,178 yards and six touchdowns). Curt Anes set a team record with 278 pass completions; he completed 278 of 414 passes (.671) for 3,692 yards and 47 touchdowns.

== 2003 ==
2003 Grand Valley State Lakers football

NCAA Division II champion

NCAA Division II Championship Game, W 10–3 vs. North Dakota
- Conference: Great Lakes Intercollegiate Athletic Conference
- Record: 14–1 (9–1 GLIAC)
- Head coach: Brian Kelly (13th season)
- Offensive coordinator: Jeff Quinn (15th season)
- Defensive coordinator: Chuck Martin (1st season)
- Home stadium: Lubbers Stadium

2003 Great Lakes Intercollegiate Athletic Conference football standings
	Conf.			Overall
Team	W		L	W		L
No. 4 Saginaw Valley State $^	10	–	0	12	–	1
No. 1 Grand Valley State ^	9	–	1	14	–	1
Northwood	6	–	4	6	–	5
Ferris State	5	–	5	6	–	5
Findlay	5	–	5	6	–	5
Indianapolis	5	–	5	6	–	5
Michigan Tech	5	–	5	5	–	5
Mercyhurst	4	–	6	5	–	6
Hillsdale	4	–	6	4	–	7
Northern Michigan	3	–	7	3	–	8
Wayne State (MI)	2	–	8	3	–	8
Ashland	2	–	8	2	–	9
$ – Conference champion; ^ – NCAA Division II playoff participant; Rankings from AFCA poll

The 2003 Grand Valley State Lakers football team was an American football team that won the 2003 NCAA Division II national championship.

The team represented the Grand Valley State University in the Great Lakes Intercollegiate Athletic Conference (GLIAC) during the 2003 NCAA Division II football season. In their 13th season under head coach Brian Kelly, the Lakers compiled a 14–1 record (9–1 against conference opponents), outscored opponents by a total of 551 to 200, and finished second in the GLIAC. The team advanced to the playoffs and won the national championship by defeating North Dakota in the championship game.

== 2004 ==
2004 Grand Valley State Lakers football

NCAA Division II quarterfinals, L 15–19 vs. North Dakota
- Conference: Great Lakes Intercollegiate Athletic Conference
- Record: 10–3 (8–2 GLIAC)
- Head coach: Chuck Martin (1st season)
- Home stadium: Lubbers Stadium

2004 Great Lakes Intercollegiate Athletic Conference football standings
	Conf.			Overall
Team	W		L	W		L
No. 10 Northwood +^	9	–	1	10	–	2
No. 11 Michigan Tech +^	9	–	1	9	–	2
No. 9 Grand Valley State ^	8	–	2	10	–	3
No. 25 Saginaw Valley State	7	–	3	7	–	3
Ferris State	6	–	4	6	–	5
Findlay	5	–	5	6	–	5
Ashland	4	–	6	5	–	6
Hillsdale	4	–	6	4	–	7
Mercyhurst	4	–	6	4	–	7
Gannon	3	–	7	4	–	7
Indianapolis	3	–	7	4	–	7
Northern Michigan	2	–	8	2	–	8
Wayne State (MI)	1	–	9	1	–	9
+ – Conference co-champions; ^ – NCAA Division II playoff participant; Rankings from AFCA poll

The 2004 Grand Valley State Lakers football team represented Grand Valley State University (GVSU) as a member of the Great Lakes Intercollegiate Athletic Conference (GLIAC) during the 2004 NCAA Division II football season. In their first season under head coach Chuck Martin, the Lakers compiled a 10–3 record (8–2 in conference games), finished in third place in the GLIAC, and outscored opponents by a total of 380 to 187.

=== Schedule ===
Date	Time	Opponent	Rank	Site	Result	Attendance	Source
August 28	7:00 p.m.	at Ferris State	No. 1	Top Taggart Field; Big Rapids, MI (Anchor–Bone Classic)	W 24–6	8,426	
September 4	7:00 p.m.	at Gannon	No. 1	Gannon University Field; Erie, PA	W 48–17	2,104	
September 11	7:00 p.m.	Indianapolis	No. 1	Lubbers Stadium; Allendale, MI	W 35–9	10,670	
September 18	7:00 p.m.	Ashland	No. 1	Lubbers Stadium; Allendale, MI	W 37–7	9,578	
October 2	12:00 p.m.	at Wayne State (MI)	No. 1	Tom Adams Field; Detroit, MI	W 34–0	2,794	
October 9	7:00 p.m.	Hillsdale	No. 1	Lubbers Stadium; Allendale, MI	W 58–7	11,606	
October 16	12:00 p.m.	at No. 23 Saginaw Valley State	No. 1	Wickes Stadium; University Center, MI	L 20–31	6,325	
October 23	7:00 p.m.	No. 18 Northwood^{†}	No. 10	Lubbers Stadium; Allendale, MI	L 14–35	11,041	
October 30	7:00 p.m.	at Northern Michigan	No. 19	Superior Dome; Marquette, MI	W 45–29	2,971	
November 6	1:00 p.m.	at No. 4 Michigan Tech	No. 17	Michigan Stadium; Ann Arbor, MI	W 24–7	50,123	
November 13	1:00 p.m.	at No. 8 Winona State	No. 15	Maxwell Field at Warrior Stadium; Winona, MN (NCAA Division II playoffs first round)	W 16–13	1,658	
November 20	12:00 p.m.	at No. 10 Northwood	No. 9	Hantz Stadium; Midland, MI (NCAA Division II playoffs second round)	W 10–7	4,215	
November 27	1:05 p.m.	at No. 4 North Dakota	No. 9	Alerus Center; Grand Forks, ND (NCAA Division II playoffs quarterfinals)	L 15–19	8,222	
^{†}Homecoming; Rankings from American Football Coaches Association Poll released prior to the game; All times are in Eastern time

== 2005 ==
2005 Grand Valley State Lakers football

NCAA Division II champion GLIAC champion

NCAA Division II Championship Game, W 10–3 vs. Northwest Missouri State
- Conference: Great Lakes Intercollegiate Athletic Conference
- Record: 13–0 (9–0 GLIAC)
- Head coach: Chuck Martin (2nd season)
- Home stadium: Lubbers Stadium

2005 Great Lakes Intercollegiate Athletic Conference football standings
	Conf.			Overall
Team	W		L	W		L
No. 1 Grand Valley State $^	9	–	0	13	–	0
No. 3 Saginaw Valley State * ^	9	–	1	11	–	2
No. 18 Northwood ^	8	–	2	9	–	3
Ashland	8	–	2	9	–	2
Michigan Tech	6	–	3	6	–	3
Indianapolis	5	–	5	6	–	5
Hillsdale	4	–	6	5	–	6
Wayne State (MI)	3	–	7	3	–	7
Ferris State	3	–	7	3	–	8
Gannon	3	–	7	3	–	8
Findlay	2	–	8	3	–	8
Mercyhurst	2	–	8	2	–	8
Northern Michigan	2	–	8	2	–	8
$ – Conference champion; ^ – NCAA Division II playoff participant; * – Saginaw Valley State forfeited all wins, giving all other GLIAC teams except Grand Valley State, Ashland, and Gannon one more official win than shown.; Rankings from AFCA poll

The 2005 Grand Valley State Lakers football team was an American football team that won the 2005 NCAA Division II national championship.

The team represented the Grand Valley State University in the Great Lakes Intercollegiate Athletic Conference (GLIAC) during the 2005 NCAA Division II football season. In their second season under head coach Chuck Martin, the Lakers compiled a perfect 13–0 record (9–0 against conference opponents), outscored opponents by a total of 434 to 170, and won the GLIAC championship. The team advanced to the playoffs and won the national championship by defeating Northwest Missouri State in the championship game.

== 2006 ==
2006 Grand Valley State Lakers football

NCAA Division II champion GLIAC champion

NCAA Division II Championship Game, W 17–14 vs. Northwest Missouri State
- Conference: Great Lakes Intercollegiate Athletic Conference
- Record: 15–0 (10–0 GLIAC)
- Head coach: Chuck Martin (3rd season)
- Home stadium: Lubbers Stadium

2006 Great Lakes Intercollegiate Athletic Conference football standings
	Conf.			Overall
Team	W		L	W		L
No. 1 Grand Valley State $^	10	–	0	15	–	0
No. 18 Northwood ^	8	–	2	8	–	3
Ferris State	7	–	3	8	–	3
Michigan Tech	6	–	4	6	–	4
Saginaw Valley State	6	–	4	6	–	4
Wayne State (MI)	6	–	4	6	–	5
Indianapolis	5	–	5	6	–	5
Hillsdale	5	–	5	5	–	6
Ashland	4	–	6	4	–	6
Mercyhurst	3	–	7	3	–	7
Northern Michigan	3	–	7	3	–	7
Findlay	1	–	9	2	–	9
Gannon	1	–	9	1	–	10
$ – Conference champion; ^ – NCAA Division II playoff participant; Rankings from AFCA poll

The 2006 Grand Valley State Lakers football team was an American football team that won the 2006 NCAA Division II national championship.

The team represented Grand Valley State University in the Great Lakes Intercollegiate Athletic Conference (GLIAC) during the 2006 NCAA Division II football season. In their third season under head coach Chuck Martin, the Lakers compiled a perfect 15–0 record (10–0 against conference opponents), outscored opponents by a total of 533 to 233, and won the GLIAC championship.

The team advanced to the playoffs and won the national championship by defeating Northwest Missouri State in the championship game. The championship was the second in a row for Grand Valley and the fourth in five years.

== 2007 ==
2007 Grand Valley State Lakers football

GLIAC champion

NCAA Division II semifinals, L 16–34 vs. Northwest Missouri State
- Conference: Great Lakes Intercollegiate Athletic Conference
- Record: 12–1 (9–0 GLIAC)
- Head coach: Chuck Martin (4th season)
- Home stadium: Lubbers Stadium

2007 Great Lakes Intercollegiate Athletic Conference football standings
	Conf.			Overall
Team	W		L	W		L
No. 4 Grand Valley State $^	9	–	0	12	–	1
No. 22 Ashland ^	8	–	1	8	–	2
Hillsdale	7	–	3	8	–	3
Saginaw Valley State *	7	–	3	7	–	3
Michigan Tech	6	–	4	6	–	5
Ferris State	5	–	5	6	–	5
Indianapolis	5	–	5	6	–	5
Northwood	5	–	5	5	–	5
Northern Michigan	4	–	6	4	–	6
Findlay	3	–	7	4	–	7
Mercyhurst	3	–	7	4	–	7
Wayne State (MI)	2	–	8	3	–	8
Gannon	0	–	10	0	–	11
$ – Conference champion; ^ – NCAA Division II playoff participant; * – Saginaw Valley State forfeited wins against Gannon, Ferris State, Northern Michigan, and Findlay.; Rankings from AFCA poll

The 2007 Grand Valley State Lakers football team represented Grand Valley State University (GVSU) as a member of the Great Lakes Intercollegiate Athletic Conference (GLIAC) during the 2007 NCAA Division II football season. In their fourth season under head coach Chuck Martin, the Lakers compiled a 12–1 record (9–0 in conference games), won the GLIAC championship, and outscored opponents by a total of 497 to 189. They advanced to the NCAA Division II playoffs where they defeated North Dakota and Central Washington, but lost to Northwest Missouri State in the semifinals.

=== Schedule ===
Date	Time	Opponent	Rank	Site	Result	Attendance	Source
August 30	7:00 p.m.	Saint Joseph's (IN)*	No. 1	Lubbers Stadium; Allendale, MI	W 42–14	11,134	
September 8		at Ashland	No. 1	Community Stadium; Ashland, OH			
September 15	7:00 p.m.	Findlay	No. 1	Lubbers Stadium; Allendale, MI	W 38–15	11,710	
September 22	1:00 p.m.	at Michigan Tech	No. 1	Sherman Field; Houghton, MI	W 48–6	3,687	
September 29	7:00 p.m.	vs. Wayne State (MI)	No. 1	Fifth Third Ballpark; Comstock Park, MI	W 41–10	10,124	
October 6	1:30 p.m.	at Mercyhurst	No. 1	Tullio Field; Erie, PA	W 59–7	1,355	
October 13	7:00 p.m.	Indianapolis	No. 1	Lubbers Stadium; Allendale, MI	W 41–17	12,080	
October 20	12:00 p.m.	at Northwood	No. 1	Hantz Stadium; Midland, MI	W 51–20	4,113	
October 27	7:00 p.m.	Ferris State	No. 1	Lubbers Stadium; Allendale, MI (Anchor–Bone Classic)	W 34–7	10,858	
November 3	12:00 p.m.	at Saginaw Valley State	No. 1	Wickes Stadium; University Center, MI (Battle of the Valleys)	W 21–10	7,108	
November 10	1:00 p.m.	Northern Michigan	No. 1	Lubbers Stadium; Allendale, MI	W 44–14	10,270	
November 24	12:30 p.m.	No. 9 North Dakota	No. 3	Lubbers Stadium; Allendale, MI (NCAA Division II second round)	W 21–14	4,862	
December 1	1:00 p.m.	No. 11 Central Washington	No. 3	Lubbers Stadium; Allendale, MI (NCAA Division II quarterfinal)	W 41–21	5,247	
December 8	8:05 p.m.	at No. 2 Northwest Missouri State*	No. 3	Bearcat Stadium; Maryville, MO (NCAA Division II semifinal)	L 16–34	7,296	
*Non-conference game; Rankings from AFCA Poll released prior to the game; All times are in Eastern time

== 2008 ==
2008 Grand Valley State Lakers football

GLIAC champion

NCAA Division II quarterfinal, L 13–19 vs. Minnesota Duluth
- Conference: Great Lakes Intercollegiate Athletic Conference
- Record: 11–1 (10–0 GLIAC)
- Head coach: Chuck Martin (5th season)
- Home stadium: Lubbers Stadium

2008 Great Lakes Intercollegiate Athletic Conference football standings
	Conf.			Overall
Team	W		L	W		L
No. 4 Grand Valley State $^	10	–	0	11	–	1
No. 15 Ashland ^	8	–	2	9	–	4
Michigan Tech	7	–	3	8	–	3
Wayne State (MI)	7	–	3	8	–	3
Saginaw Valley State	7	–	3	7	–	3
Hillsdale	6	–	4	7	–	4
Ferris State	5	–	5	6	–	5
Indianapolis	4	–	6	5	–	6
Northern Michigan	2	–	8	2	–	8
Northwood	2	–	8	2	–	8
Findlay	1	–	9	2	–	9
Tiffin	1	–	9	1	–	10
+ – Conference co-champions; ^ – NCAA Division II playoff participant; Rankings from AFCA poll

The 2008 Grand Valley State Lakers football team represented Grand Valley State University (GVSU) as a member of the Great Lakes Intercollegiate Athletic Conference (GLIAC) during the 2008 NCAA Division II football season. In their fifth season under head coach Chuck Martin, the Lakers compiled an 11–1 record (10–0 in conference games), won the GLIAC championship, and outscored opponents by a total of 462 to 152. They advanced to the NCAA Division II playoffs where they defeated Ashland in the first round and lost to Minnesota Duluth in the quarterfinals.

=== Schedule ===
Date	Time	Opponent	Rank	Site	Result	Attendance	Source
September 6	7:00 p.m.	Indianapolis	No. 2	Lubbers Stadium; Allendale, MI	W 49–21	13,201	
September 13	12:00 p.m.	at No. 25 Saginaw Valley State	No. 2	Wickes Stadium; University Center, MI	W 36–0	7,468	
September 20	7:00 p.m.	No. 24 Ferris State	No. 2	Lubbers Stadium; Allendale, MI (Anchor–Bone Classic)	W 31–13	14,612	
September 27	7:00 p.m.	Michigan Tech	No. 2	Lubbers Stadium; Allendale, MI	W 52–6	12,405	
October 4	1:30 p.m.	at Tiffin	No. 2	Frost–Kalnow Stadium; Tiffin, OH	W 49–0	1,450	
October 11	7:00 p.m.	Hillsdale	No. 1	Lubbers Stadium; Allendale, MI	W 41–10	14,161	
October 18	12:00 p.m.	at Findlay	No. 1	Donnell Stadium; Findlay, OH	W 34–10	1,054	
October 25	7:00 p.m.	No. 23 Ashland	No. 1	Lubbers Stadium; Allendale, MI	W 48–42	10,132	
November 1	1:00 p.m.	at Northern Michigan	No. 1	Superior Dome; Marquette, MI	W 45–14	1,628	
November 8	12:00 p.m.	at No. 25 Wayne State (MI)	No. 1	Tom Adams Field; Detroit, MI	W 24–10	5,152	
November 22	1:00 p.m.	No. 15 Ashland	No. 4	Lubbers Stadium; Allendale, MI (NCAA Division II first round)	W 40–7	5,580	
November 29	1:00 p.m.	No. 1 Minnesota Duluth	No. 4	Lubbers Stadium; Allendale, MI (NCAA Division II quarterfinal)	L 13–19 ^{2OT}	3,548	
Rankings from AFCA Poll released prior to the game; All times are in Eastern time

== 2009 ==
2009 Grand Valley State Lakers football

GLIAC champion

NCAA Division II Championship Game, L 23–30 vs. Northwest Missouri State
- Conference: Great Lakes Intercollegiate Athletic Conference

Ranking
- AFCA: No. 2
- Record: 13–2 (9–1 GLIAC)
- Head coach: Chuck Martin (6th season)
- Offensive coordinator: Eric Koehler (2nd season)
- Offensive scheme: No-huddle, one back
- Defensive coordinator: Matt Mitchell (2nd season)
- Base defense: 4–3
- Home stadium: Lubbers Stadium

2009 Great Lakes Intercollegiate Athletic Conference football standings
	Conf.			Overall
Team	W		L	W		L
No. 2 Grand Valley State $^	9	–	1	13	–	2
No. 11 Hillsdale ^	8	–	2	10	–	3
No. 19 Saginaw Valley State ^	8	–	2	9	–	3
Northwood	7	–	3	7	–	3
Findlay	6	–	4	7	–	4
Northern Michigan	6	–	4	6	–	4
Ashland	6	–	4	6	–	5
Wayne State (MI)	5	–	5	6	–	5
Indianapolis	3	–	7	4	–	7
Michigan Tech	2	–	8	2	–	8
Ferris State	0	–	10	1	–	10
Tiffin	0	–	10	0	–	11
$ – Conference champion; ^ – NCAA Division II playoff participant; Rankings from AFCA poll

The 2009 Grand Valley State Lakers football team represented Grand Valley State University as a member of the Great Lakes Intercollegiate Athletic Conference (GLIAC) during the 2009 NCAA Division II football season. In their sixth season under head coach Chuck Martin, the Lakers compiled a 13–2 record (9–1 in conference games), won the GLIAC championship for the fifth consecutive season, and qualified for the NCAA Division II playoff for the ninth straight year.

In the playoffs, the Lakers received a bye in the first round and won in the second round, quarterfinals, and semifinals before losing to Northwest Missouri State in the national championship game.
