= 2008 NCAA Division II football rankings =

The 2008 NCAA Division II football rankings are from the American Football Coaches Association (AFCA). This is for the 2008 season.

== Legend ==
	Increase in ranking
	Decrease in ranking
	Not ranked previous week
(#–#)	Win–loss record
(Italics)	Number of first place votes
т	Tied with team above or below also with this symbol

== American Football Coaches Association poll ==
	Preseason	Week 1 Sept 3	Week 2 Sept 10	Week 3 Sept 17	Week 4 Sept 24	Week 5 Oct 1	Week 6 Oct 8	Week 7 Oct 15	Week 8 Oct 22	Week 9 Oct 29	Week 10 Nov 5	Week 11 Nov 12	Week 12 Postseason	
1.	Valdosta State (17)	Valdosta State (2–0) (22)	Valdosta State (2–0) (23)	Valdosta State (2–0) (21)	Valdosta State (3–0) (20)	Valdosta State (4–0) (21)	Grand Valley State (5–0) (19)	Grand Valley State (6–0) (19)	Grand Valley State (7–0) (23)	Grand Valley State (8–0) (21)	Grand Valley State (9–0) (23)	Grand Valley State (10–0) (22)	Minnesota–Duluth (15–0) (26)	1.
2.	Grand Valley State (6)	Grand Valley State (0–0) (1)	Grand Valley State (1–0) (1)	Grand Valley State (2–0) (2)	Grand Valley State (3–0) (2)	Grand Valley State (4–0) (2)	North Alabama (6–0) (4)	North Alabama (7–0) (4)	Abilene Christian (7–0) (3)	Abilene Christian (8–0) (5)	Abilene Christian (9–0) (3)	Abilene Christian (10–0) (4)	Northwest Missouri State (13–2)	2.
3.	Northwest Missouri State (1)	North Alabama (1–0) (1)	North Alabama (2–0) (1)	North Alabama (3–0) (1)	North Alabama (4–0) (2)	North Alabama (5–0) (1)	Abilene Christian (5–0) (3)	Abilene Christian (6–0) (3)	Northwest Missouri State (7–1)	Northwest Missouri State (8–1)	Northwest Missouri State (9–1)	Northwest Missouri State (10–1)	North Alabama (12–2)	3.
4.	North Alabama	Carson–Newman (1–0) (1)	Abilene Christian (1–0) (1)	Abilene Christian (2–0) (2)	Abilene Christian (3–0) (2)	Abilene Christian (4–0) (2)	West Texas A&M (6–0)	West Texas A&M (7–0)	Bloomsburg (8–0)	Bloomsburg (9–0)	Delta State (8–1)	Delta State (9–1)	Grand Valley State (11–1)	4.
5.	California (PA)	California (PA) (1–0)	Nebraska–Omaha (1–0)	Nebraska–Omaha (2–0)	Nebraska–Omaha (3–0)	West Texas A&M (5–0)	Northwest Missouri State (5–1)	Northwest Missouri State (6–1)	Delta State (6–1)	Delta State (7–1)	North Alabama (9–1)	North Alabama (10–1)	Abilene Christian (11–1)	5.
6.	Carson–Newman	Abilene Christian (1–0) (1)	West Texas A&M (2–0)	West Texas A&M (3–0)	West Texas A&M (4–0)	Pittsburg State (5–0)	Bloomsburg (6–0)	Bloomsburg (7–0)	California (PA) (7–1) т	North Alabama (8–1)	Minnesota–Duluth (10–0)	Minnesota–Duluth (11–0)	California (PA) (12–2)	6.
7.	Nebraska–Omaha	Nebraska–Omaha (0–0)	Pittsburg State (2–0)	Pittsburg State (3–0)	Pittsburg State (4–0)	Northwest Missouri State (4–1)	Delta State (4–1)	Delta State (5–1)	Minnesota–Duluth (8–0) т	California (PA) (8–1)	California (PA) (9–1)	California (PA) (10–1)	Delta State (10–2)	7.
8.	Abilene Christian	Chadron State (1–0)	Central Washington (2–0)	Central Washington (3–0)	Northwest Missouri State (3–1)	Bloomsburg (5–0)	California (PA) (5–1)	California (PA) (6–1)	North Alabama (7–1)	Minnesota–Duluth (9–0)	Central Washington (9–1)	Central Washington (10–1)	Pittsburg State (11–2)	8.
9.	Chadron State	West Texas A&M (1–0)	Northwest Missouri State (1–1)	Northwest Missouri State (2–1)	Central Washington (4–0)	California (PA) (4–1)	Minnesota–Duluth (6–0)	Minnesota–Duluth (7–0)	Valdosta State (6–1)	Central Washington (8–1)	West Texas A&M (9–1)	West Texas A&M (10–1)	Chadron State (11–2)	9.
10.	West Texas A&M	Delta State (0–0)	Shepherd (2–0)	Bloomsburg (3–0)	Bloomsburg (4–0)	Minnesota–Duluth (5–0)	Valdosta State (4–1)	Valdosta State (5–1)	Central Washington (7–1)	West Texas A&M (8–1)	Pittsburg State (9–1)	Pittsburg State (10–1)	West Texas A&M (11–2)	10.
11.	Central Washington	Central Washington (1–0)	Bloomsburg (2–0)	Carson–Newman (2–1)	Carson–Newman (2–1)	Tuskegee (4–0)	Central Washington (5–1)	Central Washington (6–1)	West Texas A&M (7–1)	Tuskegee (8–0)	Tuskegee (9–0)	Tuskegee (10–0)	Bloomsburg (11–2)	11.
12.	Delta State	Northwest Missouri State (0–1)	Carson–Newman (1–1)	IUP (2–0)	IUP (3–0)	Central Washington (4–1)	Tuskegee (5–0)	Tuskegee (6–0)	Tuskegee (7–0)	Pittsburg State (8–1)	Chadron State (9–1)	Chadron State (10–1)	Valdosta State (9–3)	12.
13.	Shepherd	Shepherd (1–0)	IUP (1–0)	Tuskegee (2–0)	Tuskegee (3–0)	Tarleton State (5–0)	Chadron State (5–1)	Chadron State (6–1)	Chadron State (7–1) т	Chadron State (8–1)	Valdosta State (7–2)	Valdosta State (8–2)	Central Washington (10–2)	13.
14.	Tuskegee	Pittsburg State (1–0)	Tuskegee (1–0)	California (PA) (2–1)	California (PA) (3–1)	Delta State (3–1)	Pittsburg State (5–1)	Pittsburg State (6–1)	Pittsburg State (7–1) т	Valdosta State (6–2)	Bloomsburg (9–1)	Bloomsburg (10–1)	Tuskegee (10–1)	14.
15.	Ashland	Tuskegee (0–0)	Minnesota–Duluth (2–0)	Minnesota–Duluth (3–0)	Minnesota–Duluth (4–0)	Chadron State (4–1)	Wingate (6–0)	Wingate (7–0)	Edinboro (7–1)	Carson–Newman (6–2)	Carson–Newman (7–2)	IUP (8–2)	Ashland (9–4)	15.
16.	West Chester	IUP (0–0)	California (PA) (1–1)	Tarleton State (3–0)	Tarleton State (4–0)	Nebraska–Omaha (3–1)	IUP (4–1)	Edinboro (6–1)	Tarleton State (7–1)	Wingate (8–1)	American International (9–0)	Edinboro (9–2)	Tusculum (9–4)	16.
17.	Pittsburg State	Minnesota–Duluth (1–0)	Delta State (0–1)	Delta State (1–1)	Delta State (2–1)	Midwestern State (4–0)	Central Missouri (5–1)	Tarleton State (6–1)	Carson–Newman (5–2)	American International (8–0)	West Chester (8–2)	Ashland (8–3)	West Chester (9–4)	17.
18.	Texas A&M–Commerce	Bloomsburg (1–0)	Washburn (2–0)	Chadron State (2–1)	Chadron State (3–1)	Wingate (5–0)	Edinboro (5–1)	Carson–Newman (4–2)	Central Missouri (6–2)	IUP (6–2)	IUP (7–2)	Fayetteville State (8–2)	Carson–Newman (7–4)	18.
19.	Catawba	Tarleton State (1–0)	Tarleton State (2–0)	Albany State (3–0)	Central Missouri (4–0)	IUP (3–1)	Tarleton State (5–1)	Seton Hill (7–0)	American International (7–0)	West Chester (7–2)	Tarleton State (8–2)	American International (9–1)	Wayne State (MI) (9–3)	19.
20.	Newberry	Southern Connecticut State (1–0)	Chadron State (1–1)	Central Missouri (3–0)	Albany State (3–0)	Catawba (3–1)	West Virginia State (5–0)	Albany State (5–1)	Wingate (7–1)	Tarleton State (7–2)	Edinboro (8–2)	West Chester (8–3)	Edinboro (9–2)	20.
21.	IUP (Note: In the actual printed polls, IUP was listed as Indiana (PA))	Newberry (0–1)	Albany State (2–0)	Newberry (1–1)	Midwestern State (3–0)	Edinboro (4–1)	Carson–Newman (3–2)	Central Missouri (5–2)	IUP (5–2)	Edinboro (7–2)	Seton Hill (9–1)	Carson–Newman (7–3)	IUP (8–2)	21.
22.	Minnesota–Duluth	Washburn (1–0)	Newberry (0–1)	Shepherd (2–1)	Wingate (4–0)	Central Missouri (4–1)	Midwestern State (4–1)	Nebraska–Omaha (4–2)	West Virginia State (6–1)	Seton Hill (8–1)	Wingate (8–2)	Wayne State (MI) (9–2)	Nebraska–Omaha (7–4)	22.
23.	Mesa State	West Chester (0–1)	West Chester (1–1)	Edinboro (3–0)	Catawba (2–1)	Carson–Newman (2–2)	Albany State (4–1)	IUP (4–2)	Ashland (6–2)	Arkansas–Monticello (7–2)	Fayetteville State (8–2)	Tusculum (8–3)	Minnesota State (9–3)	23.
24.	Southern Connecticut State	Ashland (0–1)	Central Missouri (2–0)	Ferris State (3–0)	Edinboro (3–1)	West Virginia State (4–0)	Seton Hill (6–0)	American International (6–0)	West Chester (6–2)	Fayetteville State (7–2)	Ashland (7–3)	Nebraska–Omaha (7–3)	Seton Hill (10–3)	24.
25.	Bloomsburg т	Albany State (1–0)	Saginaw Valley State (1–0)	Washburn (2–1)	West Virginia State (4–0)	Ferris State (4–1)	Newberry (3–2)	West Virginia State (5–1)	Midwestern State (5–2)	Ashland (6–3)	Wayne State (MI) (8–2)	Minnesota State (9–2)	American International (9–2)	25.
26.	Virginia Union т													26.
	Preseason	Week 1 Sept 3	Week 2 Sept 10	Week 3 Sept 17	Week 4 Sept 24	Week 5 Oct 1	Week 6 Oct 8	Week 7 Oct 15	Week 8 Oct 22	Week 9 Oct 29	Week 10 Nov 5	Week 11 Nov 12	Week 12 Postseason	
		Dropped: 18 Texas A&M–Commerce; 19 Catawba; 23 Mesa State; 25 Virginia Union	Dropped: 20 Southern Connecticut State; 24 Ashland	Dropped: 23 West Chester; 25 Saginaw Valley State	Dropped: 21 Newberry; 22 Shepherd; 24 Ferris State; 25 Washburn	Dropped: 20 Albany State	Dropped: 16 Nebraska–Omaha; 20 Catawba; 25 Ferris State	Dropped: 22 Midwestern State; 25 Newberry	Dropped: 19 Seton Hill; 20 Albany State; 22 Nebraska–Omaha	Dropped: 18 Central Missouri; 22 West Virginia State; 25 Midwestern State	Dropped: 23 Arkansas–Monticello	Dropped: 19 Tarleton State; 21 Seton Hill; 22 Wingate	Dropped: 18 Fayetteville State	
