= Bob Nielson =

American football coach (born 1959)

Biographical details
- Born: September 28, 1959 (age 67)
- Education: Wartburg (1982)

Coaching career (HC unless noted)
- 1981–1986: Wartburg (OL)
- 1987–1988: Wartburg (DC)
- 1989–1990: Ripon
- 1991–1995: Wartburg
- 1996–1998: Wisconsin–Eau Claire
- 1999–2003: Minnesota–Duluth
- 2008–2012: Minnesota–Duluth
- 2013–2015: Western Illinois
- 2016–2024: South Dakota

Head coaching record
- Overall: 239–128–1
- Tournaments: 3–3 (NCAA D-III playoffs); 11–4 (NCAA D-II playoffs); 5–5 (NCAA D-I playoffs)

Accomplishments and honors

Championships
- 2 NCAA Division II (2008, 2010); 1 MVFC (2024); 1 IIAC (1993); 1 WIAC (1998); 5 NSIC (2002, 2008–2011); 5 NSIC North Division (2008–2012)

Awards
- AFCA Division II COY (2010); Liberty Mutual Division II COY (2010); IIAC Coach of the Year (1993); 3× NSIC Coach of the Year (2002, 2008, 2010); MVFC Coach of the Year (2024)

Bob Nielson (born September 28, 1959) is an American former college football coach. He served as the head football coach at Ripon College (1989–1990), Wartburg College (1991–1995), the University of Wisconsin–Eau Claire (1996–1998), University of Minnesota–Duluth (1999–2003, 2008–2012), Western Illinois University (2013–2015), and the University of South Dakota (2016–2024). His Minnesota–Duluth Bulldogs won the NCAA Division II Football Championship in 2008 and 2010.

Nielson grew up in Marion, Iowa, and is a 1982 graduate of Wartburg College in Waverly, Iowa. He received his master's degree from the University of Northern Iowa in 1988. He began his coaching career in 1981 as an assistant at Wartburg and was promoted to defensive coordinator in 1986. Nielson retired from coaching after the 2024 season, and was succeeded by Travis Johansen as head coach of the South Dakota Coyotes football program.

== Head coaching record ==
Year	Team	Overall	Conference	Standing	Bowl/playoffs	Coaches^{#}	STATS/TSN^{°}
Ripon Redmen (Midwest Conference) (1989–1990)
1989	Ripon	2–6–1	1–5	T–4th (North)			
1990	Ripon	7–2	4–2	T–2nd (North)			
Ripon:		9–8–1	5–7				
Wartburg Knights (Iowa Intercollegiate Athletic Conference) (1991–1995)
1991	Wartburg	6–4	5–3	T–3rd			
1992	Wartburg	5–5	5–3	T–3rd			
1993	Wartburg	9–2	8–0	1st	L NCAA Division III First Round		
1994	Wartburg	10–2	7–1	2nd	L NCAA Division III Quarterfinal		
1995	Wartburg	9–1	7–1	2nd			
Wartburg:		39–14	32–8				
Wisconsin–Eau Claire Blugolds (Wisconsin Intercollegiate Athletic Conference) (1996–1998)
1996	Wisconsin–Eau Claire	5–5	3–4	5th			
1997	Wisconsin–Eau Claire	7–3	4–3	4th			
1998	Wisconsin–Eau Claire	10–3	5–2	T–1st	L NCAA Division III Semifinal		
Wisconsin–Eau Claire:		22–11	12–9				
Minnesota–Duluth Bulldogs (Northern Sun Intercollegiate Conference) (1999–2003)
1999	Minnesota–Duluth	3–8	3–5	T–6th			
2000	Minnesota–Duluth	7–4	5–3	T–3rd			
2001	Minnesota–Duluth	9–3	7–2	2nd		24	
2002	Minnesota–Duluth	11–1	9–0	1st	L NCAA Division II First Round	11	
2003	Minnesota–Duluth	8–3	6–2	3rd			
Minnesota–Duluth Bulldogs (Northern Sun Intercollegiate Conference) (2008–2012)
2008	Minnesota–Duluth	15–0	10–0 / 6–0	1st / 1st (North)	W NCAA Division II Championship	1	
2009	Minnesota–Duluth	11–2	10–0 / 6–0	1st / 1st (North)	L NCAA Division II Quarterfinal	5	
2010	Minnesota–Duluth	15–0	10–0 / 6–0	1st / 1st (North)	W NCAA Division II Championship	1	
2011	Minnesota–Duluth	11–3	8–2 / 5–1	T–1st / T–1st (North)	L NCAA Division II Quarterfinal	6	
2012	Minnesota–Duluth	10–2	10–1 / 6–1	2nd / T–1st (North)	L NCAA Division II First Round	12	
Minnesota–Duluth:		100–26	78–15				
Western Illinois Leathernecks (Missouri Valley Football Conference) (2013–2015)
2013	Western Illinois	4–8	2–6	9th			
2014	Western Illinois	5–7	3–5	T–7th			
2015	Western Illinois	7–6	5–3	T–3rd	L NCAA Division I Second Round		
Western Illinois:		16–21	10–14				
South Dakota Coyotes (Missouri Valley Football Conference) (2016–2024)
2016	South Dakota	4–7	3–5	T–6th			
2017	South Dakota	8–5	4–4	T–5th	L NCAA Division I Second Round	16	15
2018	South Dakota	4–7	3–5	T–6th			
2019	South Dakota	5–7	4–4	6th			
2020–21	South Dakota	1–3	1–3	T–7th			
2021	South Dakota	7–5	5–3	T–3rd	L NCAA Division I First Round	20	18
2022	South Dakota	3–8	2–6	9th			
2023	South Dakota	10–3	7–1	2nd	L NCAA Division I Quarterfinal	3	3
2024	South Dakota	11–3	7–1	T–1st	L NCAA Division I Semifinal	4	4
South Dakota:		53–48	36–32				
Total:		239–128–1					
National championship Conference title Conference division title or championship game berth

== See also ==
- List of college football career coaching wins leaders
