= 2008 NCAA Division II football season =

American college football season

- Regular season: August 30 – November 8, 2008
- Playoffs: November 15 – December 15, 2008
- National Championship: Braly Municipal Stadium; Florence, AL
- Champion: Minnesota–Duluth
- Harlon Hill Trophy: Bernard Scott, Abilene Christian

The 2008 NCAA Division II football season, part of college football in the United States organized by the National Collegiate Athletic Association at the Division II level, began on August 30, 2008, and concluded with the NCAA Division II Football Championship on December 15, 2008, at Braly Municipal Stadium in Florence, Alabama, hosted by the University of North Alabama. The Minnesota–Duluth Bulldogs defeated the Northwest Missouri State Bearcats, 21–14, to win their first Division II national title.

The Harlon Hill Trophy was awarded to Bernard Scott, running back from Abilene Christian.

== Conference and program changes ==
- Following the demise of the North Central Conference, the nine NCC football members were dispersed as follows: four to the Northern Sun Intercollegiate Conference (NSIC), two to the Great Northwest Conference (GNAC), one to the Mid-America Intercollegiate Athletic Association (MIAA), and two to the Great West Conference in FCS.

School	Former conference	New conference
Augustana Vikings	NCC	NSIC
Brevard Tornadoes	Independent	SAC
Bryant Bulldogs	NE10	Independent (FCS)
Central Washington Wildcats	NCC	GNAC
C. W. Post Pioneers	NE10	PSAC
Chowan Hawks	Independent	CIAA
CSU Pueblo ThunderWolves	New program	RMAC
Dixie State Trailblazers	Independent	GNAC
Gannon Golden Knights	GLIAC	PSAC
Humboldt State Lumberjacks	Independent	GNAC
Lake Erie Storm	New program	Independent
Lincoln Lions	New program	Independent
Mercyhurst Lakers	GLIAC	PSAC
Minnesota State Mavericks	NCC	NSIC
Minnesota–Duluth Bulldogs	NCC	NSIC
Nebraska–Omaha Mavericks	NCC	MIAA
North Dakota Fighting Sioux	NCC	Great West (FCS)
St. Cloud State Huskies	NCC	NSIC
South Dakota Coyotes	NCC	Great West (FCS)
Southwest Baptist Bearcats	MIAA	Independent
Tiffin Dragons	GLFC	GLIAC
Western Oregon Wolves	Independent	GNAC
Western Washington Vikings	NCC	GNAC

Brevard, Central State, Dixie State, and Seton Hill completed their transitions to Division II and became eligible for the postseason.

=== Regional realignment ===
The geographic names of the four super regions gave way to numerical names. The Northeast Region, with the addition of the CIAA, became Super Region 1; the Southeast Region minus the CIAA became Super Region 2. The Northwest Region, with the addition of the RMAC and loss of the defunct NCC, became Super Region 3, while the Southwest Region, minus the RMAC and with the addition of the GNAC (sponsoring football again after a two-year hiatus) became Super Region 4.

== Conference standings ==
=== Super Region 1 ===
2008 Central Intercollegiate Athletic Association football standings
	Conf.			Overall
Team	W		L	W		L
Eastern Division
Elizabeth City State xy	7	–	0	7	–	4
Bowie State	4	–	3	5	–	4
Virginia State	4	–	3	5	–	5
Saint Paul's	3	–	4	5	–	5
Virginia Union	3	–	4	5	–	5
Western Division
Shaw xy$	6	–	1	8	–	3
Fayetteville State x	6	–	1	8	–	2
St. Augustine's	3	–	4	4	–	6
Johnson C. Smith	2	–	5	3	–	7
Livingstone	2	–	5	2	–	8
Chowan	1	–	6	2	–	8
Championship: Shaw 36, Elizabeth City State 7
$ – Conference champion; x – Division champion/co-champions; y – Championship game participant; Lincoln (PA) played a full CIAA schedule as a provisional Division II member.

2008 Northeast-10 Conference football standings
	Conf.			Overall
Team	W		L	W		L
No. 25 American International $^	7	–	0	9	–	2
Southern Connecticut ^	6	–	1	8	–	3
Merrimack	4	–	3	6	–	4
Bentley	4	–	3	5	–	6
Pace	3	–	4	4	–	6
Stonehill	2	–	5	4	–	6
Saint Anselm	1	–	6	2	–	8
Assumption	1	–	6	1	–	9
$ – Conference champion; ^ – NCAA Division II playoff participant; Rankings from AFCA poll

2008 Pennsylvania State Athletic Conference football standings
	Conf.			Overall
Team	W		L	W		L
East
No. 17 West Chester xy^	7	–	0	9	–	4
No. 11 Bloomsburg ^	6	–	1	11	–	2
East Stroudsburg	5	–	2	9	–	2
Kutztown	4	–	3	5	–	6
Shippensburg	3	–	4	4	–	7
C. W. Post	2	–	5	3	–	8
Millersville	1	–	6	1	–	10
Cheyney	0	–	7	0	–	11
West
No. 6 California (PA) xy$^	7	–	0	12	–	2
No. 20 Edinboro	5	–	2	9	–	2
No. 21 IUP	5	–	2	8	–	2
Mercyhurst	5	–	2	7	–	4
Slippery Rock	3	–	4	5	–	6
Gannon	2	–	5	4	–	7
Clarion	1	–	6	3	–	8
Lock Haven	0	–	7	0	–	11
Championship: California (PA) 47, West Chester 36
$ – Conference champion; x – Division champion/co-champions; y – Championship game participant; ^ – NCAA Division II playoff participant; Rankings from AFCA poll

2008 West Virginia Intercollegiate Athletic Conference football standings
	Conf.			Overall
Team	W		L	W		L
Glenville State $	7	–	1	8	–	3
No. 24 Seton Hill ^	6	–	2	10	–	3
West Liberty State	6	–	2	7	–	4
West Virginia State	5	–	3	7	–	3
Charleston (WV)	5	–	3	7	–	4
Shepherd	3	–	5	5	–	5
Fairmont State	3	–	5	5	–	6
West Virginia Wesleyan	1	–	7	1	–	10
Concord	0	–	8	0	–	11
$ – Conference champion; ^ – NCAA Division II playoff participant; Rankings from AFCA Poll

=== Super Region 2 ===
2008 Gulf South Conference football standings
	Conf.			Overall
Team	W		L	W		L
No. 7 Delta State $^	8	–	0	10	–	2
No. 3 North Alabama ^	7	–	1	12	–	2
No. 12 Valdosta State ^	6	–	2	9	–	3
Ouachita Baptist	5	–	3	7	–	3
Arkansas–Monticello	5	–	3	7	–	4
Henderson State	4	–	4	5	–	5
Arkansas Tech	4	–	4	5	–	5
West Alabama	2	–	6	4	–	7
Southern Arkansas	2	–	6	2	–	8
Harding	1	–	7	2	–	9
West Georgia	0	–	8	0	–	10
$ – Conference champion; ^ – NCAA Division II playoff participant; Rankings from AFCA poll

2008 South Atlantic Conference football standings
	Conf.			Overall
Team	W		L	W		L
No. 16 Tusculum +^	5	–	2	9	–	4
No. 18 Carson–Newman +^	5	–	2	7	–	4
Newberry +	5	–	2	6	–	4
Wingate	4	–	3	8	–	3
Mars Hill	4	–	3	7	–	4
Catawba	4	–	3	6	–	4
Lenoir–Rhyne	1	–	6	3	–	8
Brevard	0	–	7	1	–	9
+ – Conference co-champions; ^ – NCAA Division II playoff participant; Rankings from AFCA poll

2008 Southern Intercollegiate Athletic Conference football standings
	Conf.			Overall
Team	W		L	W		L
No. 14 Tuskegee $	9	–	0	10	–	1
Albany State ^	6	–	3	7	–	4
Morehouse	6	–	3	6	–	4
Fort Valley State	6	–	3	6	–	5
Clark Atlanta	5	–	4	6	–	5
Benedict	4	–	5	5	–	6
Lane	4	–	5	4	–	7
Stillman	2	–	7	3	–	8
Miles	2	–	7	2	–	8
Kentucky State	1	–	8	3	–	8
$ – Conference champion; ^ – NCAA Division II playoff participant; Rankings from AFCA poll

2008 NCAA Division II Super Region 2 independents football records
	Conf.			Overall
Team	W		L	W		L
UNC Pembroke		–		9	–	1
North Greenville		–		2	–	9
Lincoln (PA) #		–		0	–	9
# – Provisional NCAA Division II member

=== Super Region 3 ===
2008 Great Lakes Intercollegiate Athletic Conference football standings
	Conf.			Overall
Team	W		L	W		L
No. 4 Grand Valley State $^	10	–	0	11	–	1
No. 15 Ashland ^	8	–	2	9	–	4
Michigan Tech	7	–	3	8	–	3
Wayne State (MI)	7	–	3	8	–	3
Saginaw Valley State	7	–	3	7	–	3
Hillsdale	6	–	4	7	–	4
Ferris State	5	–	5	6	–	5
Indianapolis	4	–	6	5	–	6
Northern Michigan	2	–	8	2	–	8
Northwood	2	–	8	2	–	8
Findlay	1	–	9	2	–	9
Tiffin	1	–	9	1	–	10
+ – Conference co-champions; ^ – NCAA Division II playoff participant; Rankings from AFCA poll

2008 Northern Sun Intercollegiate Conference football standings
	Conf.			Overall
Team	W		L	W		L
North Division
No. 1 Minnesota–Duluth $^	10	–	0	15	–	0
St. Cloud State	7	–	3	7	–	4
Bemidji State	4	–	6	5	–	6
Mary	4	–	6	4	–	7
Minnesota State–Moorhead	2	–	8	2	–	9
Minnesota–Crookston	1	–	9	2	–	9
Northern State	1	–	9	1	–	10
South Division
No. 23 Minnesota State ^	9	–	1	9	–	3
No. 19 Wayne State (NE) ^	8	–	2	9	–	3
Augustana (SD) #	7	–	3	8	–	4
SW Minnesota State	6	–	4	6	–	5
Winona State	6	–	4	6	–	5
Concordia–St. Paul	3	–	7	4	–	7
Upper Iowa	2	–	8	2	–	9
$ – Conference champion; ^ – NCAA Division II playoff participant; # – Mineral Water Bowl participant; Rankings from AFCA poll

2008 Rocky Mountain Athletic Conference football standings
	Conf.			Overall
Team	W		L	W		L
No. 9 Chadron State $^	9	–	0	11	–	2
Colorado Mines #	7	–	2	8	–	4
Nebraska–Kearney	7	–	2	7	–	4
Mesa State	6	–	3	6	–	5
Adams State	5	–	4	5	–	6
CSU Pueblo	3	–	6	4	–	6
New Mexico Highlands	3	–	6	3	–	8
Western New Mexico	2	–	7	2	–	8
Western State (CO)	2	–	7	2	–	8
Fort Lewis	1	–	8	2	–	9
$ – Conference champion; ^ – NCAA Division II playoff participant; # – Dixie Rotary Bowl participant; Rankings from AFCA poll

2008 Great Lakes Football Conference standings
	Conf.			Overall
Team	W		L	W		L
Missouri S&T $	3	–	1	7	–	4
Kentucky Wesleyan	2	–	1	4	–	6
Central State (OH)	2	–	1	2	–	7
Saint Joseph's (IN)	1	–	2	5	–	5
Lincoln (MO)	0	–	3	2	–	8
$ – Conference champion

2008 NCAA Division II Super Region 3 independents football records
	Conf.			Overall
Team	W		L	W		L
Lake Erie #		–		3	–	8
# – Provisional NCAA Division II member

=== Super Region 4 ===
2008 Great Northwest Athletic Conference football standings
	Conf.			Overall
Team	W		L	W		L
No. 13 Central Washington $^	8	–	0	10	–	2
Western Oregon	5	–	3	7	–	4
Western Washington #	5	–	3	6	–	5
Dixie State	2	–	6	4	–	7
Humboldt State	0	–	8	2	–	9
$ – Conference champion; ^ – NCAA Division II playoff participant; # – Dixie Rotary Bowl participant; Rankings from AFCA poll

2008 Lone Star Conference football standings
	Conf.			Overall
Team	W		L	W		L
Overall*
No. 5 Abilene Christian $^	9	–	0	11	–	1
No. 10 West Texas A&M ^	8	–	1	11	–	2
Tarleton State	6	–	3	8	–	3
Texas A&M–Kingsville	6	–	3	7	–	4
Central Oklahoma	6	–	3	7	–	4
SE Oklahoma State	6	–	3	6	–	5
Midwestern State	5	–	4	6	–	4
Texas A&M–Commerce	5	–	4	5	–	5
Angelo State	3	–	6	3	–	8
East Central	2	–	7	3	–	8
SW Oklahoma State	1	–	8	3	–	8
Eastern New Mexico †	1	–	8	2	–	9
Northeastern State	0	–	9	1	–	10
North Division
Central Oklahoma x	5	–	0	7	–	4
SE Oklahoma State	4	–	1	6	–	5
Texas A&M–Commerce	3	–	2	5	–	5
East Central	2	–	3	3	–	8
SW Oklahoma State	1	–	4	3	–	8
Northeastern State	0	–	5	1	–	10
South Division
No. 5 Abilene Christian x$^	6	–	0	11	–	1
No. 10 West Texas A&M ^	5	–	1	11	–	2
Tarleton State	3	–	3	8	–	3
Texas A&M–Kingsville	3	–	3	7	–	4
Midwestern State	3	–	3	6	–	4
Angelo State	1	–	5	3	–	8
Eastern New Mexico †	0	–	6	2	–	9
$ – Conference champion; ^ – NCAA Division II playoff participant; * – The LSC counted separate overall and division standings. † – Eastern New Mexico vacated both wins.; Rankings from AFCA Poll

2008 Mid-America Intercollegiate Athletics Association football standings
	Conf.			Overall
Team	W		L	W		L
No. 2 NW Missouri State $^	9	–	0	13	–	2
No. 8 Pittsburg State ^	8	–	1	11	–	2
No. 22 Nebraska–Omaha ^	6	–	3	7	–	4
Central Missouri	5	–	4	7	–	4
Missouri Western #	5	–	4	6	–	6
Washburn	4	–	5	6	–	5
Truman	3	–	6	4	–	7
Emporia State	2	–	7	4	–	7
Missouri Southern	2	–	7	4	–	7
Fort Hays State	1	–	8	2	–	9
$ – Conference champion; ^ – NCAA Division II playoff participant; # – Mineral Water Bowl participant; Rankings from AFCA poll

2008 NCAA Division II Super Region 4 independents football records
	Conf.			Overall
Team	W		L	W		L
Southwest Baptist		–		5	–	6
OK Panhandle State		–		3	–	7

== Conference summaries ==
Conference Champions

Central Intercollegiate Athletic Association – Shaw
Great Lakes Football Conference – Missouri S&T
Great Lakes Intercollegiate Athletic Conference – Grand Valley State
Great Northwest Athletic Conference – Central Washington
Gulf South Conference – Delta State
Lone Star Conference – Abilene Christian
Mid-America Intercollegiate Athletics Association – Northwest Missouri State
Northeast-10 Conference – American International
Northern Sun Intercollegiate Conference – Minnesota–Duluth
Pennsylvania State Athletic Conference – California (PA)
Rocky Mountain Athletic Conference – Chadron State
South Atlantic Conference – Carson-Newman, Newberry, and Tusculum
Southern Intercollegiate Athletic Conference – Tuskegee
West Virginia Intercollegiate Athletic Conference – Glenville State

== Postseason ==
2008 NCAA Division II Football Championship
- Teams: 24
- Finals Site: Braly Municipal Stadium; Florence, Alabama
- Champion: Minnesota-Duluth; (1st title, title game)
- Runner-up: NW Missouri St.; (6th title game)
- Semifinalists: California (PA); North Alabama
- Winning coach: championship
- Attendance: 6,219

The 2008 NCAA Division II Football Championship playoffs involved 24 schools playing in a single-elimination tournament to determine the national champion of men's NCAA Division II college football.

The tournament began on November 15, 2008, and concluded on December 13, 2008, with the 2008 NCAA Division II National Football Championship game at Braly Municipal Stadium near the campus of the University of North Alabama in Florence, Alabama.

In the championship game the University of Minnesota Duluth Bulldogs defeated the Northwest Missouri State University Bearcats, 21–14.

== Participants ==
School	Conference	Season record
Abilene Christian University	Lone Star Conference	10–0
Albany State University	Southern Intercollegiate Athletic Conference	7–3
American International College	Northeast Ten Conference	9–1
Ashland University	Great Lakes Intercollegiate Athletic Conference	8–3
Bloomsburg University of Pennsylvania	Pennsylvania State Athletic Conference	10–1
California University of Pennsylvania	Pennsylvania State Athletic Conference	10–1
Carson-Newman College	South Atlantic Conference	7–3
Central Washington University	Great Northwest Athletic Conference	10–1
Chadron State College	Rocky Mountain Athletic Conference	10–1
Delta State University	Gulf South Conference	9–1
Grand Valley State University	Great Lakes Intercollegiate Athletic Conference	10–0
University of Minnesota Duluth	Northern Sun Intercollegiate Conference	11–0
Minnesota State University, Mankato	Northern Sun Intercollegiate Conference	9–2
University of Nebraska at Omaha	Mid-America Intercollegiate Athletics Association	7–3
University of North Alabama	Gulf South Conference	10–1
Northwest Missouri State University	Mid-America Intercollegiate Athletics Association	10–1
Pittsburg State University	Mid-America Intercollegiate Athletics Association	10–1
Seton Hill University	West Virginia Intercollegiate Athletic Conference	9–2
Southern Connecticut State University	Northeast Ten Conference	8–2
Tusculum College	South Atlantic Conference	8–3
Valdosta State University	Gulf South Conference	8–2
Wayne State College	Northern Sun Intercollegiate Conference	9–2
West Chester University	Pennsylvania State Athletic Conference	8–3
West Texas A&M University	Lone Star Conference	10–1

=== Bids by conference ===
Conference	Total	Schools	Super Region
Great Lakes Intercollegiate Athletic Conference	2	Ashland University; Grand Valley State University	3
Great Northwest Athletic Conference	1	Central Washington University	4
Gulf South Conference	3	Delta State University; University of North Alabama; Valdosta State University	2
Lone Star Conference	2	Abilene Christian University; West Texas A&M University	4
Mid-America Intercollegiate Athletics Association	3	University of Nebraska at Omaha; Northwest Missouri State University; Pittsburg State University	4
Northeast Ten Conference	2	Southern Connecticut State University; American International College	1
Northern Sun Intercollegiate Conference	3	Minnesota State University, Mankato; Wayne State College; University of Minnesota Duluth	3
Pennsylvania State Athletic Conference	3	Bloomsburg University of Pennsylvania; California University of Pennsylvania; West Chester University	1
Rocky Mountain Athletic Conference	1	Chadron State College	3
South Atlantic Conference	2	Carson-Newman College; Tusculum College	2
Southern Intercollegiate Athletic Conference	1	Albany State University	2
West Virginia Intercollegiate Athletic Conference	1	Seton Hill University	1

== Playoff format ==
The first-round games were conducted on the campus of one of the competing institutions as determined by the NCAA Division II Football Committee. Two teams in each super regional earned first-round byes. The first-round winners advanced to face a bye team in their super regional. Second-round winners met in the quarterfinals and quarterfinal winners advanced to play in the semifinals.

First-round, second-round, quarterfinal and semifinal games were played on the campus of one of the competing institutions as determined by the NCAA Division II Football Committee. The home team at the championship was determined by the Division II Football Committee and the Shoals National Championship Committee.

== National television coverage ==
The championship game was played at Braly Municipal Stadium in Florence, Alabama and broadcast live on ESPN2 on December 16.

The semifinal games were broadcast on ESPN2 (North Alabama vs. Northwest Mo., 4pm EST) and ESPN Classic (California (PA) vs. Minnesota-Duluth, 12pm EST) on December 6.

The Superregional championship (quarterfinal) games were broadcast on ESPN2 and ESPN Classic on November 29.

== Tournament Notes ==
=== Final standings ===
Place	School
1st	University of Minnesota-Duluth
2nd	Northwest Missouri State University
3rd	California University of Pennsylvania
3rd	University of North Alabama
5th	Abilene Christian University
5th	Bloomsburg University of Pennsylvania
5th	Delta State University
5th	Grand Valley State University
9th	Ashland University
9th	Chadron State College
9th	Pittsburg State University
9th	Seton Hill University
9th	Tusculum College
9th	Valdosta State University
9th	West Chester University
9th	West Texas A&M University
17th	Albany State University
17th	American International College
17th	Carson-Newman College
17th	Central Washington University
17th	Minnesota State University, Mankato
17th	Southern Connecticut State University
17th	University of Nebraska at Omaha
17th	Wayne State College

=== Bracket and standings ===
==== Super Regional 1 ====
First round November 15
6	Seton Hill	14
3	American International	7
5	S. Connecticut	32
4	West Chester	52

Second round November 22
2	California (PA)	48
6	Seton Hill	7
1	Bloomsburg	28
4	West Chester	21

Super Regional finals November 29
2	California (PA)	27
1	Bloomsburg	24

==== Super Regional 3 ====
First round November 15
6	Wayne State (NE)	17
3	Chadron State	23
5	Minnesota State	16
4	Ashland	27

Second round November 22
2	Minnesota–Duluth	20
3	Chadron State	10
1	Grand Valley State	40
4	Ashland	7

Super Regional finals November 29
2	Minnesota–Duluth 2OT	19
1	Grand Valley State	13

==== Super Regional 2 ====
First round November 15
6	Carson–Newman	20
3	Valdosta State	24
5	Albany State	22
4	Tusculum	34

Second round November 22
2	North Alabama	37
3	Valdosta State	10
1	Delta State	27
4	Tusculum	19

Super Regional finals November 29
2	North Alabama	55
1	Delta State	34

==== Super Regional 4 ====
First round November 15
6	Nebraska–Omaha	21
3	Pittsburg State	33
5	Central Washington	42
4	West Texas A&M	49

Second round November 22
2	Northwest Missouri State	38
3	Pittsburg State	35
1	Abilene Christian	93
4	West Texas A&M	68

Super Regional finals November 29
2	Northwest Missouri State	45
1	Abilene Christian	36

==== Semifinals and championship ====
Semifinals; December 6
SR1 Champion	California (PA)	7
SR3 Champion	Minnesota–Duluth	45
SR2 Champion	North Alabama	7
SR4 Champion	Northwest Missouri State	41

Championship; December 13
SR3 Champion	Minnesota–Duluth	21
SR4 Champion	Northwest Missouri State	14

=== Individual game results ===
==== Round 1 ====
===== Seton Hill vs. American International =====
	1	2	3	4	Total
Seton Hill	0	0	7	7	14
American International	0	0	7	0	7

The Seton Hill Griffins' defensive end Mychal Butler intercepted a deflected pass thrown by the American International quarterback Rob Parent with 5:45 left and scored with 5:02 remaining for a 14–7 win over the Yellow Jackets' in the first-ever NCAA playoff game for both programs.

===== S. Connecticut vs. West Chester =====
	1	2	3	4	Total
S. Connecticut	6	12	0	14	32
West Chester	14	14	14	10	52

West Chester defeated Southern Connecticut State, 52–32, as Jackson Fagan rushed for 172 yards and three touchdowns. Fagan scored on runs of 61, 7 and 4 yards. QB Joe Wright threw for 250 yards and two touchdowns and the Golden Rams also scored on a 22-yard interception return by defensive tackle Scott Schiavo.

===== Wayne State vs. Chadron State =====
	1	2	3	4	Total
Wayne State	10	0	0	7	17
Chadron State	7	9	7	0	23

Wayne State quarterback Silas Fluellen completed 17 of 40 passes for 236 yards and a touchdown, but could not overcome the 243 yards and three touchdowns by Chadron State quarterback Joe McLain who left the game with an injury as the Eagles defeated the Wildcats, 23–17. Wayne State had four turnovers inside the 10-yard line in the game.

===== Minnesota State vs. Ashland =====
	1	2	3	4	Total
Minnesota State	6	7	0	3	16
Ashland	0	13	0	14	27

In its first ever home playoff game the Ashland University Eagles defeated the Minnesota State-Mankato Mavericks, 27–16. Quarterback Billy Cundiff threw a 66-yard scoring completion to Joe Horn with 11:56 remaining in the fourth quarter as the Eagles took the lead for good. Previously, Ashland was 0–3 in the school's playoff history.

===== Carson-Newman vs. Valdosta State =====
	1	2	3	4	Total
Carson-Newman	7	7	0	6	20
Valdosta State	0	7	8	9	24

The Valdosta State Blazers fell behind early, but rallied in the second half to defeat Carson-Newman Eagles, 24–20. Ronnye Nelson ran for 83 rushing yards and 59 receiving yards for the Blazers. The win was the fifth straight playoff win for the Blazers, the defending NCAA Division II Champions.

===== Albany State vs. Tusculum =====
	1	2	3	4	Total
Albany State	3	7	12	0	22
Tusculum	0	7	7	20	34

The Tusculum College Pioneers only led the final 3:31 of the game against the Albany State Rams, but scored on three fourth quarter drives to win 34–22. Senior quarterback Corey Russell finished the game with 87 yards rushing and two touchdowns on 15 carries and was 23-of-38 passing for 274 yards and three touchdowns for the Pioneers. Tusculum maintained its streak of no games lost at home in two seasons.

===== Nebraska-Omaha vs Pittsburg State =====
	1	2	3	4	Total
Nebraska-Omaha	7	7	0	7	21
Pittsburg State	7	13	0	13	33

Quarterback Mark Smith scored a rushing touchdown that put the Pittsburg State Gorillas out of range of the late-surging University of Nebraska-Omaha Mavericks in a 33–21 win. The 24th-ranked Mavericks took the lead in game, 21–20, with 13:05 left in the game, but the Gorillas took back the lead, 26–21 with 5:27 left in the game. Smith scored on a 32-yard touchdown with 2:10 left in the game to seal the win. Smith finished with 365 yards of total offensive, including 212 rushing yards for the Gorillas.

===== C. Washington vs. West Texas =====
	1	2	3	4	Total
C. Washington	7	14	14	7	42
West Texas	8	27	14	0	49

Keith Flemming put the West Texas A&M Buffaloes ahead for good with a 6-yard run late in the second quarter in a 49–42 victory over Central Washington Wildcats. Flemming ran for four touchdowns and Keith Null threw three touchdown passes (35 of 49 passes for 463 yards and one interception).

==== Round 2 ====
===== West Chester vs. Bloomsburg =====
	1	2	3	4	Total
West Chester	7	0	7	7	21
Bloomsburg	7	0	7	14	28

The West Chester Golden Rams got a late touchdown pass but failed to recover an onside kick as Bloomsburg held on for a 28–21 victory. A 62-yard interception return for a touchdown by Jesse Cooper in the fourth quarter gave the Huskies a 21–14 lead. Bloomsburg scored on a 28-yard touchdown pass with 3:41 left in the fourth to extend the lead to 28–14.

===== California (PA) vs. Seton Hill =====
	1	2	3	4	Total
Seton Hill	0	7	0	0	7
California (PA)	14	14	14	6	48

California University of Pennsylvania's QB Kevin McCabe threw three touchdowns as the Vulcan's defeated Seton Hill, 48–7. McCabe completed 19 of 24 passes for 253 yards. Terrence Johnson ran an 82-yard kickoff return for a touchdown. Seton Hill's lone score came on a 30-yard fumble return for a touchdown.

===== Chadron State vs. Minnesota Duluth =====
	1	2	3	4	Total
Chadron State	0	0	10	0	10
Minnesota Duluth	0	7	13	0	20

Minnesota Duluth held Chadron State to just 8 yards rushing for the game in a 20–10 victory. The Bulldogs held the ball for nearly 40 minutes while gaining 388 yards in total offense. The Eagles gained 178 yards in total offense.

===== Ashland vs. Grand Valley State =====
	1	2	3	4	Total
Ashland	0	0	0	7	7
Grand Valley	14	10	3	13	40

The Grand Valley State, the top seed in Super Region 3, defeated Ashland University, 40–7. The Lakers scored on their first two possessions and built a 24–0 halftime lead. Ashland's only score came on the first play of the fourth quarter as quarterback Billy Cundiff hit Christian Livingston with an 8-yard touchdown pass. Grand Valley answered on the next offensive play with a 62-yard touchdown run. The Lakers' defense ended with eight sacks and nine tackles for lost yardage.

===== Valdosta State vs. North Alabama =====
	1	2	3	4	Total
Valdosta State	0	3	0	7	10
N. Alabama	7	9	14	7	37

North Alabama avenged last season's quarterfinal playoff loss to defending Division II Champion Valdosta State, 37–10, as QB A.J. Milwee threw for 167 yards and one touchdown and ran for another score. The Lions took a 16–3 halftime lead and scored two touchdowns in the third quarter and one in the fourth quarter to seal the win. Valdosta State only touchdown came as Dudley Spence returned a fumble 55-yard for a score in the fourth quarter.

===== Tusculum vs. Delta State =====
	1	2	3	4	Total
Tusculum	0	6	7	6	19
Delta State	0	10	10	7	27

Delta State compiled 529 yards of offense as QB while Garrett DeWitt threw for 344 yards and backup quarterback Blake Barnes rushed for two touchdowns as the Statesmen defeated Tusculum, 27–19. The Statesmen defense held allowed 425 (310 in the air) but forced Tusculum into three turnovers. The win advanced Delta State to the Division II playoff quarterfinals for the third straight year.

===== Pittsburg State vs. Northwest Mo. =====
	1	2	3	4	Total
Pittsburg State	7	6	15	7	35
Northwest Mo.	7	17	7	7	38

Northwest Missouri State came from behind to defeat Pittsburg State 38–35. Pittsburg State took the lead with 3 minutes, 30 seconds remaining, but QB Joel Osborn threw a 15-yard touchdown pass to Kendall Wright with 55 seconds left gave the Bearcats a victory. The Gorillas racked up 408 total yards of offense as QB Mark Smith rushed for 123 yards and passed for 185 yards.

===== West Texas vs. Abilene Christian =====
	1	2	3	4	Total
West Texas A&M	14	20	20	14	68
Abilene Christian	21	21	37	14	93

The Abilene Christian University Wildcats set a record for points in an NCAA playoff game (93) as they scored touchdowns on 13 of its 15 possessions in a 93–68 defeat of West Texas A&M. The Wildcats compiled 810 total yards as quarterback Billy Malone threw six touchdown passes, each to a different receiver, and completed 16 of 25 passes for 383 yards. Bernard Scott rushed for 292 yards on 19 carries and scored seven touchdowns.

West Texas was led by quarterback Keith Null (42-of-63, 595 yards, seven touchdowns), and Charly Martin who had 14 catches for 323 yards and five TDs as the Buffs compiled 721 total yards of offense.

The Wildcats will play Northwest Missouri State in the national quarterfinals, a rematch of ACU's 44–27 victory on Aug. 30.

==== Super Regional finals ====
===== California (PA) vs. Bloomsburg =====
	1	2	3	4	Total
California (PA)	6	7	14	0	27
Bloomsburg	7	7	3	7	24

California of Pennsylvania eliminated Bloomsburg University, 27–24, to advance to the semifinals. The Vulcans scored two third-quarter touchdowns to take a 27–17 lead, but Bloomsburg scored on a 1-yard run by quarterback Dan Latorre to close the gap to 27–24. The Huskies were attempting a game-winning drive, but the Vulcans linebacker Darren Burns forced a fumble by Latorre on a 28-yard quarterback draw and Brandon Gordon recovered the fumble for the

Vulcans. The Vulcans then ran out the clock.

===== Minnesota Duluth vs. Grand Valley =====
	1	2	3	4	OT	Total
Minnesota Duluth	0	7	6	0	6	19
Grand Valley	3	3	0	7	0	13

Sophomore linebacker Kiel Fechtelkotter intercepted a pass from Grand Valley State quarterback Brad Iciek in the second overtime to seal a 19–13 double-overtime victory. UMD scored a touchdown in the second overtime, but the Lakers blocked the extra-point attempt. Two plays later, Fechtelkotter made the interception, ending the game.

===== North Alabama vs. Delta State =====
	1	2	3	4	Total
North Alabama	7	24	21	3	55
Delta State	7	7	7	13	34

The Lions avenged their only loss this season, defeating Delta State, 55–34. While defense gave up 541 yards in total offense to the Statesmen, they also forced six turnovers total and scored twice on defense (interception returns for touchdowns by Darron Dampier and Michael Johnson). Wide receiver Joemal Campbell caught two touchdown passes and blocked a punt for the Lions.

===== Northwest Mo. vs. Abilene Christian =====
	1	2	3	4	Total
Northwest Mo.	14	14	7	10	45
Abilene Christian	10	10	7	9	36

Northwest Missouri State secured their fourth straight trip to the NCAA Division II semifinals with a 45–36 victory against Abilene Christian. The Bearcats' quarterback Joel Osborn threw for 247 yards (19-of-28) and two touchdowns. Backup quarterback Blake Bolles finished with 69 yards through the air and one touchdown pass, and 51 yards rushing and one touchdown run.

==== Semifinals ====
===== California (PA) vs. Minnesota Duluth =====
	1	2	3	4	Total
California (PA)	0	0	7	0	7
Minnesota Duluth	7	10	14	14	45

A week after upsetting Grand Valley State, the Minnesota Duluth Bulldogs advanced to the National Championship game with a 45–7 victory over California (Pa.). The Bulldogs held the Vulcans to their lowest rushing total of the season, while forcing five turnovers. California had averaged nearly 200 yards rushing and 38 points per game this season. Isaac Odim rushed for 126 yards and scored four touchdowns for the Bulldogs.

===== North Alabama vs. Northwest Mo. =====
	1	2	3	4	Total
North Alabama	0	7	0	0	7
Northwest Mo.	20	7	14	0	41

Northwest Missouri State Bearcats played turnover-free football while forcing two North Alabama turnovers en route to a 41–7 victory. The Bearcats defense held North Alabama to one touchdown as they advanced to their fourth straight national championship game.

==== Championship ====
	1	2	3	4	Total
Minnesota Duluth	0	7	7	7	21
Northwest Mo.	0	0	0	14	14

The Minnesota Duluth Bulldogs won the school's first NCAA Division II football championship in a 21–14 win over the Northwest Missouri State Bearcats. Minnesota Duluth's quarterback Ted Schlafke threw 38-yard touchdown pass to Tony Doherty with 14 seconds left in the second quarter to give the Bulldogs a 7–0 lead. Later he threw a 5-yard touchdown midway through the third quarter to Issac Odim for a 14–0 lead. Odim ran for a 4-yard touchdown early in the fourth quarter for a 21–0 lead. Northwest Missouri's first score came on a 44-yard interception return by Aldwin Foster-Rettig cutting the score to 21–7. The Bearcats cut the lead to 21–14 as Raphael Robinson scored on a 2-yard touchdown catch with 1:36 left in the game. Minnesota Duluth recovered an onside kick attempt and ran out the clock.

Minnesota Duluth finished the season with a 15–0 record. Northwest Missouri ended the season with a 13–2 record and suffered its fourth consecutive loss in the Division II championship game.

== See also ==
- 2008 NCAA Division II National Football Championship game
- 2008 NCAA Division I FBS football season
- 2008 NCAA Division I FCS football season
- 2008 NCAA Division III football season
- 2008 NAIA football season
