= Vern Emerson =

American football player (born 1945)

No. 76
- Position: Offensive tackle

Personal information
- Born: September 2, 1945 (age 81); Anoka, Minnesota, U.S.
- Listed height: 6 ft 5 in (1.96 m)
- Listed weight: 260 lb (118 kg)

Career information
- High school: Isle (Isle, Minnesota)
- College: Minnesota-Duluth (1967)
- NFL draft: 1968: 12th round, 313th overall pick

Career history
- St. Louis Cardinals (1969–1971)

Career NFL statistics
- Games played: 23
- Stats at Pro Football Reference

Vern Emerson (born September 2, 1945) is an American former professional football player who was a tackle for the St. Louis Cardinals of the National Football League (NFL) from 1969 to 1971. He played college football for the Minnesota Duluth Bulldogs.
