= 2008 North Alabama Lions football team =

American college football season

2008 North Alabama Lions football

NCAA Division II Semifinal, L 7–41 at Northwest Missouri State
- Conference: Gulf South Conference
- Record: 12–2 (7–1 GSC)
- Head coach: Mark Hudspeth (7th season)
- Offensive coordinator: Alan Arrington (1st season)
- Defensive coordinator: Karl Morgan (4th season)
- Home stadium: Braly Municipal Stadium

2008 Gulf South Conference football standings
	Conf.			Overall
Team	W		L	W		L
No. 7 Delta State $^	8	–	0	10	–	2
No. 3 North Alabama ^	7	–	1	12	–	2
No. 12 Valdosta State ^	6	–	2	9	–	3
Ouachita Baptist	5	–	3	7	–	3
Arkansas–Monticello	5	–	3	7	–	4
Henderson State	4	–	4	5	–	5
Arkansas Tech	4	–	4	5	–	5
West Alabama	2	–	6	4	–	7
Southern Arkansas	2	–	6	2	–	8
Harding	1	–	7	2	–	9
West Georgia	0	–	8	0	–	10
$ – Conference champion; ^ – NCAA Division II playoff participant; Rankings from AFCA poll

The 2008 North Alabama Lions football team represented the University of North Alabama as a member of the Gulf South Conference (GSC) during the 2008 NCAA Division II football season. Led by Mark Hudspeth in his seventh and final season as head coach, the Lions compiled an overall record of 12–2 with a mark of 7–1 in conference play, placing second in the GSC. For the fourth straight season, North Alabama advanced to the NCAA Division II football championship playoffs, where, after a first round by, the Lions defeated conference foe Valdosta State in the second round and Delta State in the quarterfinals before losing to the eventual national runner-up, Northwest Missouri State, in the semifinals. The team played home games at Braly Municipal Stadium in Florence, Alabama.

Hudspeth left the program after the season to go to the Mississippi State University as passing game coordinator. North Alabama replaced him with Terry Bowden.

== Schedule ==
Date	Time	Opponent	Rank	Site	TV	Result	Attendance
August 28	7:00 p.m.	Southern Arkansas*	No. 4	Braly Municipal Stadium; Florence, AL		W 57–14	11,024
September 4	7:00 p.m.	at No. 4 Carson–Newman*	No. 3	Burke–Tarr Stadium; Jefferson City, TN	CBS College Sports	W 20–13	5,007
September 13	6:00 p.m.	Henderson State	No. 3	Braly Municipal Stadium; Florence, AL		W 45–20	9,572
September 20	6:00 p.m.	at West Georgia	No. 3	Grisham Stadium; Carrollton, GA		W 53–0	3,709
September 25	7:00 p.m.	Harding	No. 3	Braly Municipal Stadium; Florence, AL	CSS	W 52–0	9,017
October 4	6:00 p.m.	at Arkansas Tech	No. 3	Thone Stadium; Russellville, AR		W 45–24	6,475
October 9	6:00 p.m.	at North Greenville*	No. 2	Younts Stadium; Tigerville, SC		W 52–7	1,821
October 16	7:00 p.m.	at No. 7 Delta State	No. 2	McCool Stadium; Cleveland, MS	CSS	L 28-34	5,575
October 25	6:00 p.m.	No. 9 Valdosta State^{†}	No. 8	Braly Municipal Stadium; Florence, AL		W 41–17	11,102
November 1	7:00 p.m.	No. 23 Arkansas–Monticello	No. 6	Braly Municipal Stadium; Florence, AL		W 45–14	10,082
November 8	7:00 p.m.	at West Alabama	No. 5	Tiger Stadium; Livingston, AL (rivalry)		W 41–9	5,238
November 22	12:00 p.m.	No. 13 Valdosta State*	No. 5	Braly Municipal Stadium; Florence, AL (NCAA Division II Second Round)		W 37–10	7,035
November 29	11:00 a.m.	at No. 4 Delta State*	No. 5	McCool Stadium; Cleveland, MS (NCAA Division II Quarterfinal)	CSS	W 55–34	4,175
December 6	3:00 p.m.	at No. 3 Northwest Missouri State*	No. 5	Bearcat Stadium; Maryville, MO (NCAA Division II Semifinal)	ESPN2	L 41–7	6,042
*Non-conference game; ^{†}Homecoming; Rankings from AFCA Poll released prior to the game; All times are in Central time

== Game summaries ==
=== Southern Arkansas ===
	1	2	3	4	Total
Muleriders	0	14	0	0	14
No. 4 Lions	13	17	14	13	57

=== At Carson–Newman ===
	1	2	3	4	Total
No. 3 Lions	0	3	7	10	20
No. 4 Eagles	7	0	0	6	13

=== Henderson State ===
	1	2	3	4	Total
Reddies	10	3	7	0	20
No. 3 Lions	14	17	7	7	45

=== At West Georgia ===
	1	2	3	4	Total
No. 3 Lions	0	0	0	0	0
Wolves	0	0	0	0	0

=== Harding ===
	1	2	3	4	Total
Bison	0	0	0	0	0
Lions	0	0	0	0	0

=== Arkansas Tech ===
	1	2	3	4	Total
Lions	0	0	0	0	0
Wonderboys	0	0	0	0	0

=== North Greenville ===
	1	2	3	4	Total
Lions	7	28	7	10	52
Crusaders	0	0	0	7	7

=== Delta State ===
	1	2	3	4	Total
Lions	0	0	0	0	0
Statesmen	0	0	0	0	0

=== Valdosta State ===
	1	2	3	4	Total
Blazers	0	0	0	0	0
Lions	0	0	0	0	0

=== Arkansas–Monticello ===
	1	2	3	4	Total
Boll Weevil	0	0	0	0	0
Lions	0	0	0	0	0

=== West Alabama ===
	1	2	3	4	Total
Lions	0	0	0	0	0
Tigers	0	0	0	0	0
