= Minnesota Duluth Bulldogs football =

- First season: 1930; 96 years ago
- Head coach: Curt Wiese; 10th season, 97–23 (.808)
- Location: Duluth, Minnesota
- Stadium: Griggs Field at James S. Malosky Stadium
- NCAA division: Division II
- Conference: Northern Sun Intercollegiate Conference (NSIC)
- Colors: Maroon and gold

NCAA Division II championships
- 2008, 2010

Conference championships
- NSIC: 1932, 1937, 1938, 1946, 1948, 1979, 1980, 1985, 1987, 1990, 1995, 1996, 2002, 2008, 2009, 2010, 2011, 2012, 2014, 2018, 2021, 2025

Division championships
- NSIC North: 2008, 2009, 2010, 2011, 2012, 2013, 2014, 2015, 2016, 2017, 2018, 2019, 2025
- Website: umdbulldogs.com

The Minnesota Duluth Bulldogs football program is the intercollegiate American football team for the University of Minnesota Duluth located in the U.S. state of Minnesota.

== Championships ==
=== National championships ===
Year	Association	Division	Head coach	Record	Opponent	Result
2008	NCAA (2)	Division II (2)	Bob Nielson	15–0 (10–0 NSIC)	NW Missouri State	W, 21–14
2010	NCAA (2)	Division II (2)	Bob Nielson	15–0 (10–0 NSIC)	Delta State	W, 20–17

== Postseason appearances ==
=== NCAA Division II playoffs ===
The Bulldogs have made thirteen appearances in the NCAA Division II playoffs. Their combined record is 14–11, with two national championships.

Year	Round	Opponent	Result
2002	First Round	NW Missouri State	L, 41–45
2005	First Round	North Dakota	L, 12–23
2008	Second Round; Quarterfinals; Semifinals; National Championship	Chadron State; Grand Valley State; California (PA); NW Missouri State	W, 20–10; W, 19–13 ^{2OT} W, 45–7; W, 21–14
2009	Second Round; Quarterfinals	Nebraska–Kearney; Grand Valley State	W, 42–7; L, 10–24
2010	Second Round; Quarterfinals; Semifinals; National Championship	St. Cloud State; Augustana (SD); NW Missouri State; Delta State	W, 20–17 ^{OT} W, 24–13; W, 17–13; W, 20–17
2011	First Round; Second Round; Quarterfinals	Saginaw Valley State; CSU Pueblo; Wayne State (MI)	W, 30–27 ^{OT} W, 24–21; L, 25–31
2012	First Round	Missouri Western	L, 55–57 ^{3OT}
2013	First Round; Second Round	Emporia State; NW Missouri State	W, 55–13; L, 21–45
2014	First Round; Second Round; Quarterfinals	NW Missouri State; Ouachita Baptist; Minnesota State	W, 25–21; W, 48–45; L, 17–44
2016	First Round	Emporia State	L, 26–59
2018	First Round	Texas A&M–Commerce	L, 17–33
2021	First Round	Angelo State	L, 14–48
2025	First Round	Ashland	L, 7–32

== Notable former players ==
Notable alumni include:

- Tom Adams
- Rob Aurich
- Lou Barle
- Dan Devine
- Vern Emerson
- Ted McKnight
- Dick Pesonen
- David Viaene
- Aiden Williams
