= Curt Wiese =

American college football coach

Current position
- Title: Head coach
- Team: Minnesota Duluth
- Conference: NSIC
- Record: 121–33

Biographical details
- Born: Stoughton, Wisconsin, U.S.

Playing career
- 1995–1997: Minnesota State–Mankato
- 1998: Wisconsin–Eau Claire
- Position: Quarterback

Coaching career (HC unless noted)
- 1999–2001: Wisconsin–Eau Claire (GA)
- 2003–2005: Marietta (OC)
- 2006–2007: Marietta
- 2008–2012: Minnesota Duluth (OC)
- 2013–present: Minnesota Duluth

Head coaching record
- Overall: 130–44
- Bowls: 1–1
- Tournaments: 3–5 (NCAA D-II playoffs)

Accomplishments and honors

Championships
- 4 NSIC (2014, 2018, 2021, 2025); 8 NSIC North Division (2013–2019, 2025)

Awards
- Liberty Mutual Coach of the Year (2013)

Curt Wiese is an American college football coach. He is the head football coach for the University of Minnesota Duluth, a position he has held since 2013, after he was promoted from offensive coordinator. In 2013, he was awarded the Liberty Mutual Coach of the Year Award for NCAA Division II. Prior to his arrival at Duluth, Wiese served as head coach at Marietta from 2006 to 2007 where he compiled an overall record of nine wins and eleven losses (9–11).

== Head coaching record ==
Year	Team	Overall	Conference	Standing	Bowl/playoffs	AFCA^{#}	D2^{°}
Marietta Pioneers (Ohio Athletic Conference) (2006–2007)
2006	Marietta	6–4	5–4	T–4th			
2007	Marietta	3–7	3–6	T–7th			
Marietta:		9–11	8–10				
Minnesota Duluth Bulldogs (Northern Sun Intercollegiate Conference) (2013–present)
2013	Minnesota–Duluth	11–2	10–1 / 7–0	T–2nd / 1st (North)	L NCAA Division II Second Round	8	
2014	Minnesota–Duluth	13–1	11–0 / 7–0	T–1st / 1st (North)	L NCAA Division II Quarterfinal	3	
2015	Minnesota–Duluth	9–3	8–3 / 6–1	T–4th / T–1st (North)	W Mineral Water Bowl		
2016	Minnesota–Duluth	10–2	10–1 / 7–0	2nd / 1st (North)	L NCAA Division II First Round	14	
2017	Minnesota–Duluth	9–3	9–2 / 7–0	T–3rd / 1st (North)	L Mineral Water Bowl		
2018	Minnesota–Duluth	11–1	11–0 / 7–0	T–1st / 1st (North)	L NCAA Division II First Round	13	
2019	Minnesota–Duluth	8–3	8–3 / 7–0	T–3rd / 1st (North)			
2020–21	No team—COVID-19						
2021	Minnesota–Duluth	9–3	9–2 / 5–1	T–1st / 2nd (North)	L NCAA Division II First Round		
2022	Minnesota Duluth	8–3	8–3 / 5–1	T–4th / 2nd (North)			
2023	Minnesota Duluth	9–2	8–2	T–2nd		25	25
2024	Minnesota Duluth	7–4	6–4	T–5th			
2025	Minnesota Duluth	10–2	9–1 / 5–1	1st / 1st (North)	L NCAA Division II First Round	16	16
2026	Minnesota Duluth	7–4	7–3 / 3–3	T–3rd / T–4th (North)			
Minnesota Duluth:		121–32	114–24				
Total:		130–43					
National championship Conference title Conference division title or championship game berth
