= California Vulcans football =

Intercollegiate American football program

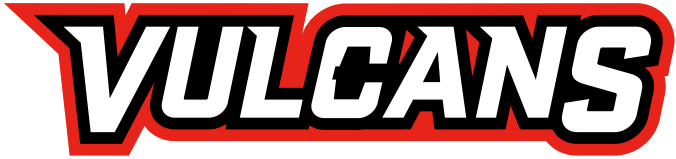
- First season: 1916; 110 years ago
- Athletic director: Thomas Pucci
- Head coach: Gary Dunn; 7th season, 56–20 (.737)
- Location: California, Pennsylvania
- Stadium: Hepner–Bailey Field at Adamson Stadium (capacity: 6,500)
- NCAA division: Division II
- Conference: PSAC
- Division: West
- Colors: Red and black
- All-time record: 413–391–27 (.513)
- Playoff record: 12–9 (.571)

Conference championships
- 1984, 2008, 2016

Division championships
- 1968, 1984, 2008, 2009, 2016, 2024
- Rivalries: IUP Crimson Hawks
- Fight song: Chariots of Fire
- Mascot: Blaze the Vulcan
- Website: calvulcans.com/football

The California Vulcans football program is the intercollegiate American football team for Pennsylvania Western University California (known before July 2022 as California University of Pennsylvania), located in California, Pennsylvania. The team competes in NCAA Division II and is a member of the Pennsylvania State Athletic Conference. California University's first football team was fielded in 1916. The Vulcans play home games at the 6,500-seat Hepner–Bailey Field at Adamson Stadium on their campus, and are coached by Gary Dunn.

== Notable former players ==
Notable alumni, and their current (or last) NFL or professional team, include;

- Tommie Campbell – Jacksonville Jaguars CB
- Brendan Folmar – Pittsburgh Gladiators QB
- Eric Kush – Cleveland Browns OL/C
- Kevin McCabe – Pittsburgh Steelers (offseason) QB
- Rontez Miles – New York Jets FS
- C. J. Goodwin – Dallas Cowboys CB/ST
- Erik Harris – Oakland Raiders SS
- Perry Kemp – Green Bay Packers WR
- Wes Cates – Saskatchewan Roughriders RB
- Terry O'Shea – Pittsburgh Steelers TE
- Dewey McDonald - Seattle Seahawks DB

== Playoff appearances ==
=== NCAA Division II ===
The Vulcans have made ten appearances in the NCAA Division II playoffs, with a combined record is 12–9.

Year	Round	Opponent	Result
2007	Second Round; Regional Final; Semifinals	Southern Connecticut; Shepherd; Valdosta State	W, 43–7; W, 58–38; L, 24–28
2008	Second Round; Regional Final; Semifinals	Seton Hill; Bloomsburg; Minnesota–Duluth	W, 20–10; W, 27–24; L, 7–45
2009	First Round; Second Round; Regional Final; Semifinals	Fayetteville State; Shippensburg; West Liberty; NW Missouri State	W, 42–13; W, 26–21; W, 57–35; L, 31–56
2010	First Round	Bloomsburg	L, 26–28
2011	First Round; Second Round	Elizabeth City State; Winston-Salem State	W, 44–0; L, 28–35
2016	Second Round; Regional Final	IUP; Shepherd	W, 44–23; L, 30–41
2017	First Round	Assumption	L, 31–40
2024	First Round; Second Round; Quarterfinals	East Stroudsburg; Ashland; Slippery Rock	W, 30–27; W, 34–33; L, 13–31
2025	First Round; Second Round	Virginia Union; Frostburg State	W, 27–24; L, 21–23
2026	First Round	Virginia Union	TBP
