= Griggs Field at James S. Malosky Stadium =

Football stadium in Duluth, Minnesota

James S. Malosky Stadium

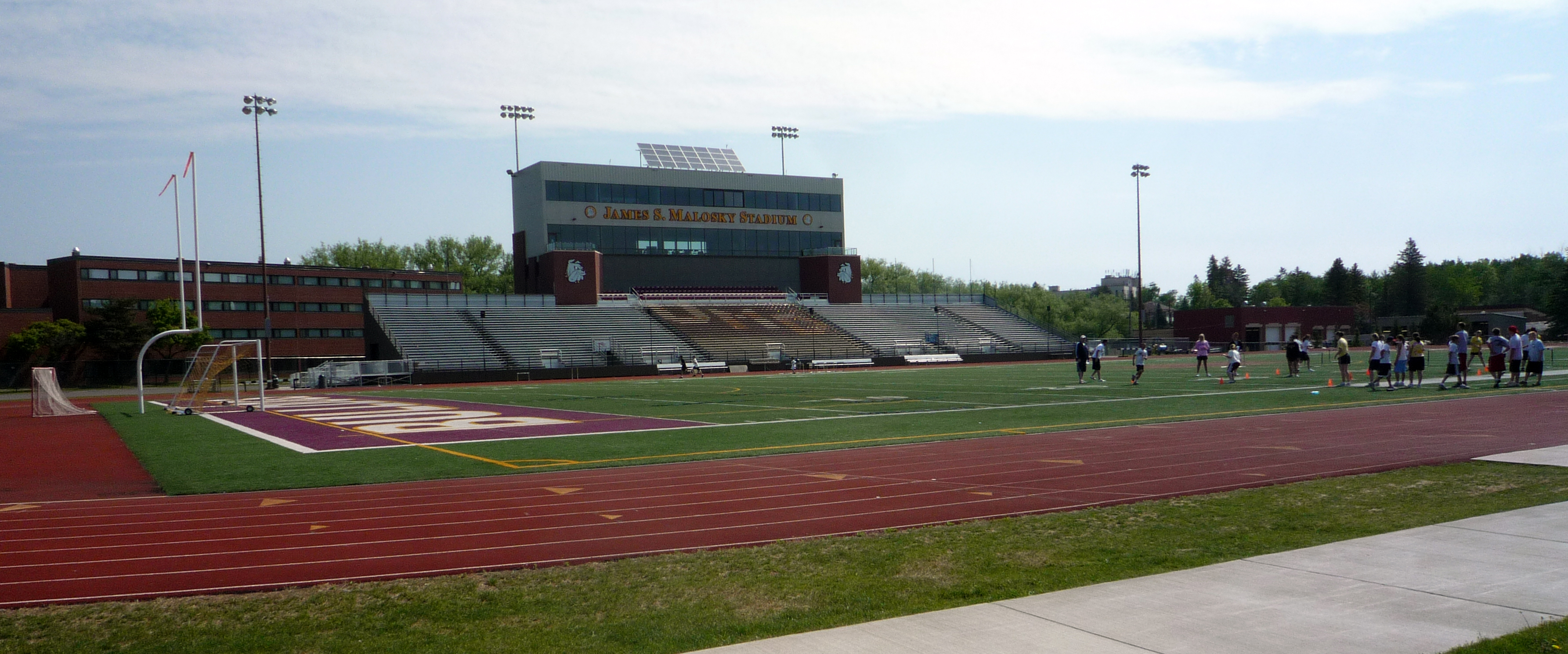
- View of the stadium in 2009

- Location in Minnesota Location in the United States
- Full name: Griggs Field at James S. Malosky Stadium
- Former names: Griggs Field
- Location: Duluth, Minnesota, United States
- Coordinates: 46°49′10″N 92°04′47″W
- Owner: University of Minnesota, Duluth
- Operator: Minnesota–Duluth Bulldogs
- Public transit: Duluth Transit Authority

Construction
- Opened: 1966; 60 years ago

Tenant
- Minnesota–Duluth Bulldogs football

Website
- umdbulldogs.com/malosky-stadium

Griggs Field at James S. Malosky Stadium located on the campus of the University of Minnesota Duluth in Duluth, Minnesota is the home stadium, since 1966, of the UMD Bulldogs football team and of the UMD women's soccer since 1994. The facility was originally known as Griggs Field, after Richard L. Griggs, a philanthropist whose many business interests included a long time era as President and CEO of Northern National Bank/Duluth National Bank and was active in the founding of Jefferson Lines. He was also a regent for the University of Minnesota. Its current name was adopted in 2008 to honor long time football coach Jim Malosky.

In addition to housing the football, women's soccer and track teams, the 4,000-seat Griggs Field also hosts a number of high school football and track and field events throughout the year as well as UMD's intramural activities.
