= Upper Iowa Peacocks =

Athletic teams of Upper Iowa University

- University: Upper Iowa University
- Nickname: Peacock
- NCAA: Division II
- Conference: Great Lakes Valley Conference
- Athletic director: Rick Hartzell
- Location: Fayette, Iowa
- Varsity teams: 13
- Football stadium: Harms-Eischeid Stadium
- Basketball arena: Dorman Gymnasium
- Baseball stadium: Robertson Woods Field
- Soccer stadium: Harms-Eischeid Stadium
- Colors: Peacock blue and white
- Website: uiupeacocks.com
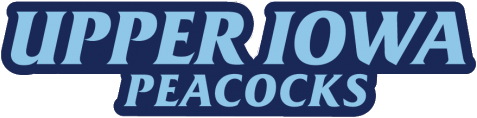

The Upper Iowa Peacocks (also UIU Peacocks) are the athletic teams that represent Upper Iowa University, located in Fayette, Iowa, in intercollegiate sports at the Division II level of the National Collegiate Athletic Association (NCAA), primarily competing in the Great Lakes Valley Conference (GLVC) for most of their sports since the 2023–24 academic year. The Peacocks previously competed in the Northern Sun Intercollegiate Conference (NSIC) from 2003-04 to 2022-23, and the Iowa Intercollegiate Athletic Conference (IIAC; known as the American Rivers Conference since the 2018–19 academic year) of the NCAA Division III ranks from 1922–23 to 2002–03. Their colors are blue and white.

Upper Iowa competes in 13 intercollegiate varsity sports: Men's sports include baseball, basketball, football, golf, soccer and wrestling; while women's sports include basketball, cross country, golf, soccer, softball, track & field and volleyball; and co-ed sports include cheer and dance.

== Varsity teams ==
Men's sports	Women's sports
Baseball	Basketball
Basketball	Cross country
Football	Golf
Golf	Soccer
Soccer	Softball
Wrestling	Track and field
	Volleyball
	Wrestling

=== Softball ===
Upper Iowa's softball team appeared in two Women's College World Series, in 1970 and 1971.

=== Men's soccer ===
Upper Iowa's men's soccer team won the MIAA conference title in 2015. In the same year they reached the 'Sweet 16' stage of the NCAA tournament.

Football

Upper Iowa’s football team defeated the Hillsdale Chargers 37-28 in the inaugural Albanese Candy Bowl (formerly known as the American Crossroads Bowl) Upper Iowa boasts a 1-0 record in bowl games.

=== Former sports ===
In 2023, Upper Iowa cut men's and women's bowling, men's cross country, men's indoor and outdoor track and field, women's tennis, women’s lacrosse, and shotgun sports.
