= Minnesota Crookston Golden Eagles =

- University: University of Minnesota Crookston
- Conference: Northern Sun Intercollegiate Conference (primary); ECAC (equestrian)
- NCAA: Division II
- Athletic director: Stephanie Helgeson
- Location: Crookston, Minnesota
- Varsity teams: 9
- Football stadium: Widseth Field
- Basketball arena: Lysaker Gym
- Baseball stadium: UMC Baseball Field
- Soccer stadium: UMC Soccer Field
- Nickname: Golden Eagles
- Colors: Maroon and gold
- Website: goldeneaglesports.com

The Minnesota Crookston Golden Eagles (also UMC Golden Eagles) are the athletic teams that represent University of Minnesota Crookston, located in Crookston, Minnesota, in intercollegiate sports at the NCAA Division II ranks, primarily competing in the Northern Sun Intercollegiate Conference (NSIC) since the 1999–2000 academic year; with the women's equestrian teams competing in the Intercollegiate Horse Show Association (IHSA).

Minnesota–Crookston (UMC) competes in 12 intercollegiate varsity sports: Men's sports include baseball, basketball, cross country and golf; while women's sports include basketball, cross country, equestrian (hunt seat and Western), golf, soccer, softball, tennis and volleyball. Club sports include men's ice hockey and co-ed trap shooting.

Minnesota–Crookston (UMC) also sponsored football until after the 2019 fall season (2019–20 school year), when they decided to drop the program.

== Individual sports ==
=== Ice hockey ===
The UMC Golden Eagles hockey team played at the NCAA Division III level in the MCHA hockey-only conference through the 2008-2009 season. Being a Division II school the university operated the hockey team with no scholarships under Division III guidelines. The University discontinued the varsity hockey program following that season. UMC will honor the financial commitment to the new ice arena built in 2009 in Crookston, Minn. The campus signed a five-year lease beginning in 2010. The university currently fields a club hockey team in the Division 2 American Collegiate Hockey Association.

== Ed Widseth Field ==
Ed Widseth Field is a stadium on the campus of the University of Minnesota Crookston. It was named Ed Widseth Field in lasting tribute to Ed Widseth. Ed Widseth graduated from UM-Crookston when it was named Northwest School of Agriculture.

Widseth graduated from Northwest School of Agriculture in 1932. He was an All-American, All-Pro (MVP 1938) and College Football Hall of Fame Recipient.
