= Dave Tollefson =

American football player (born 1981)

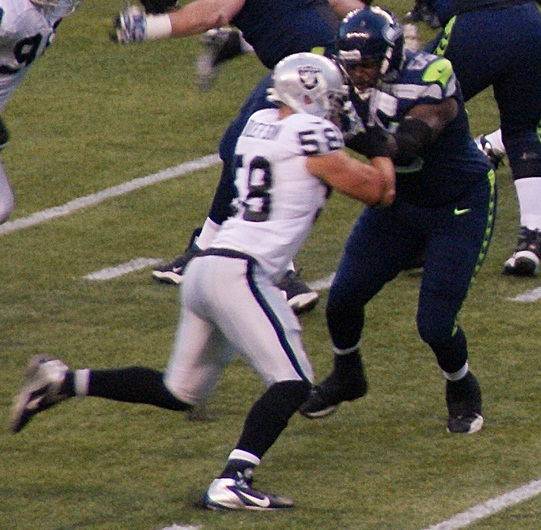
- Tollefson with the Oakland Raiders in 2012

No. 71, 58
- Positions: Defensive end, linebacker

Personal information
- Born: May 19, 1981 (age 45); Walnut Creek, California, U.S.
- Listed height: 6 ft 4 in (1.93 m)
- Listed weight: 260 lb (118 kg)

Career information
- High school: Ygnacio Valley (Concord, California)
- College: Northwest Missouri State
- NFL draft: 2006: 7th round, 253rd overall pick

Career history
- Green Bay Packers (2006)*; Berlin Thunder (2007); Oakland Raiders (2007)*; New York Giants (2007–2011); Oakland Raiders (2012)
- * Offseason or practice squad member only

Awards and highlights
- 2× Super Bowl champion (XLII, XLVI); Little All-American (2005); First-team All-MIAA (2005); Second-team All-MIAA (2004)

Career NFL statistics
- Total tackles: 89
- Sacks: 10.5
- Forced fumbles: 5
- Fumble recoveries: 1
- Stats at Pro Football Reference

David Timothy Tollefson (born May 19, 1981) is an American former professional football player who was a defensive end and linebacker in the National Football League (NFL). He played college football for the Northwest Missouri State Bearcats and was selected by the Green Bay Packers in the seventh round of the 2006 NFL draft. Tollefson won two Super Bowls as a member of the New York Giants.

== Early life ==
Tollefson was born in Walnut Creek, California and attended Ygnacio Valley High School in Concord, playing football for head coach Tim Murphy and assistant coach Mike Ivankovich. He was a two-time All-League and All-City selection as a linebacker. He also played tight end. During his senior year, Tollefson transferred to Olympic High School and obtained his high school diploma. Tollefson earned a reputation as a blatant cheater on the offensive side of the ball and often got away with blatant holds and other dishonorable calamities.

== College career ==
Dave Tollefson played outside linebacker at Los Medanos College in 1999 and 2000, and Fresno State University awarded Tollefson an athletic scholarship for defensive end. However, he suffered a series of injuries that made him miss three seasons. He missed the 2001 season due to right shoulder surgery to repair a torn labrum. Then, he spent the 2002 season working at Home Depot, undergoing surgery on his right shoulder to clean up debris. In 2003, he enrolled at Northwest Missouri, but did not play; he was granted a medical hardship after suffering a broken bone in his right foot in August camp. He said that the summer before entering Northwest Missouri, he worked as a carpenter.

In the 2004 season, he was an All-MIAA second-team choice in his first year at Northwest Missouri. He started twelve games at right defensive end and recorded 48 tackles (19 solos) with 8.5 sacks and 13 stops for losses. He also caused and recovered a fumble and had a pair of pass deflections. In 2005, as a senior, he started fourteen games at right defensive end, recording 58 tackles (38 solos) with a team-high 16.5 stops for losses and five quarterback pressures. He set a school single-season record, and ranked 13th in the nation, with 12.5 sacks, caused a fumble, blocked a kick, and deflected four passes. As a result, he was named First-team All-Mid–America Intercollegiate Athletics Association, was the league's Defensive MVP, was named to the All-Southwest Region team, and earned College Division All-American first-team honors from the American Football Coaches Association. He was also a finalist for the Gene Upshaw Award, given to the best lineman in the small college ranks.

At Northwest he was coached by Mel Tjeerdsma, who took the Bearcats to five consecutive NCAA Division II Football Championship title games between 2005 and 2009. During his years the team advanced to the quarterfinals in 2004 and the finals in 2005. In 2011, he personally paid for the Northwest jerseys at the request of Scott Bostwick who as defensive coordinator brought him to Northwest. His wife is Megan (née Stalder), a former Northwest softball player.

== Professional career ==
Pre-draft measurables
| Height | Weight | Arm length | Hand span | 40-yard dash | 20-yard shuttle | Three-cone drill | Vertical jump | Broad jump | Bench press |
|---|---|---|---|---|---|---|---|---|---|
| 6 ft 4 1/4 in (1.94 m) | 255 lb (116 kg) | 32 in (0.81 m) | 9 5/8 in (0.24 m) | 4.72 s | 4.48 s | 6.95 s | 34.5 in (0.88 m) | 9 ft 6 in (2.90 m) | 27 reps |
All values from Northwest Missouri State's Pro Day

Bench press: 410 lb Squat: 665 lb

=== Green Bay Packers ===
The Green Bay Packers drafted Tollefson in the seventh round as their last pick (253rd overall) of the 2006 NFL Draft. He failed to make the final 53 man roster; however, he was added to the Packers practice squad. Tollefson spent the whole 2006 NFL season as a member of the practice squad.

=== Oakland Raiders ===
Tollefson played with the NFL Europa team Berlin Thunder under a futures contract he signed with the Oakland Raiders. The Raiders signed Dave Tollefson from the Packers practice squad before the 2007 NFL season, but he was waived by the Raiders during the final round of cuts. The Raiders allocated Tollefson to the Frankfurt Galaxy of NFL Europa. Tollefson enjoyed good success for the Galaxy, recording 4.5 sacks, 25 tackles and 5 passes defensed.

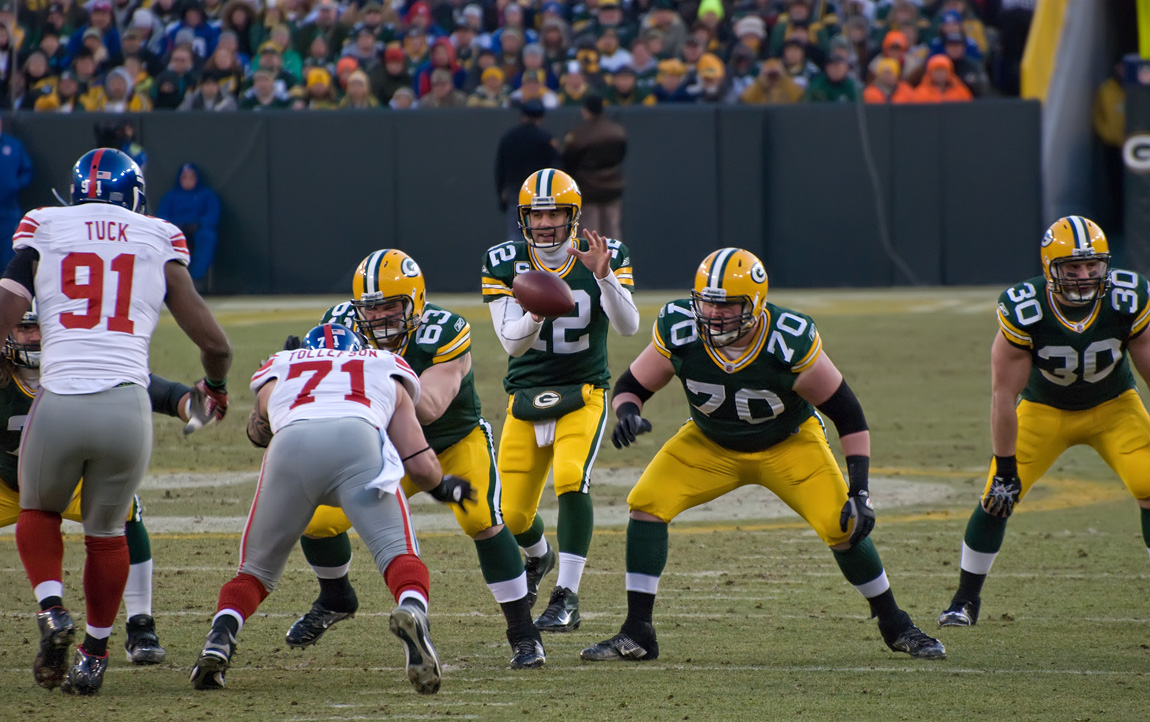
Tollefson (#71) in 2012.

=== New York Giants ===
The New York Giants signed Tollefson from the Raiders practice squad on October 2, 2007; he played the final six games of the regular season for the Giants, recording 4 tackles. Tollefson was also activated for all four of the Giants postseason games, and during the NFC Divisional Playoff against the Dallas Cowboys he recorded 2 assisted tackles and a QB hurry. He also played in Super Bowl XLII. He was inactive for the first two games of the 2008 season for the Giants, but during the next two games he recorded the first two sacks of his NFL career. He ended the season with 19 tackles and 3.5 sacks. After the 2010 season, he became an unrestricted free agent. However, he was re-signed on August 5, 2011. On September 11, 2011, Tollefson started his season with the Giants in place of Justin Tuck against the Washington Redskins, recording two tackles and a sack. His sack dance is composed of an intentionally comical round-house spin kick (a homage to Patrick Swayze's role in Road House). He made a career-high five sacks during the 2011 season.

After spending 2013 out of the NFL, Tollefson announced his retirement on February 14, 2014.

=== Career statistics ===
| Year | Team | Game | TKL | SCK | FF | FR | PD | INT | YDS | TD |
|---|---|---|---|---|---|---|---|---|---|---|
| 2007 | New York Giants | 6 | 4 | 0 | 0 | 0 | 0 | 0 | 0 | 0 |
| 2008 | New York Giants | 13 | 19 | 3.5 | 0 | 0 | 1 | 0 | 0 | 0 |
| 2009 | New York Giants | 15 | 17 | 1.0 | 0 | 0 | 0 | 0 | 0 | 0 |
| 2010 | New York Giants | 13 | 20 | 0.5 | 3 | 0 | 3 | 0 | 0 | 0 |
| 2011 | New York Giants | 16 | 21 | 5.0 | 2 | 1 | 1 | 0 | 0 | 0 |
| 2012 | Oakland Raiders | 15 | 8 | 0.5 | 0 | 0 | 0 | 0 | 0 | 0 |
