= 2009 Texas A&M–Commerce Lions football team =

American college football season

2009 Texas A&M–Commerce Lions football

LSC North Division champion
- Conference: Lone Star Conference
- Record: 5–5 (5–4 LSC)
- Head coach: Guy Morriss (1st season)
- Offensive coordinator: Dan Lounsbury (1st season)
- Offensive scheme: Pro-style
- Home stadium: Memorial Stadium

2009 Lone Star Conference football standings
	Conf.			Overall
Team	W		L	W		L
Overall*
No. 10 Tarleton State +^	7	–	2	10	–	3
No. 14 Midwestern St. +^	7	–	2	9	–	3
No. 16 Texas A&M–Kingsville +^	7	–	2	9	–	3
No. 13 Abilene Christian ^	6	–	3	9	–	4
West Texas A&M #	6	–	3	7	–	5
SE Oklahoma State	5	–	4	7	–	4
Angelo State	5	–	4	6	–	5
Texas A&M–Commerce	5	–	4	5	–	5
Central Oklahoma	4	–	5	4	–	7
Eastern New Mexico †	2	–	7	3	–	8
Northeastern State	2	–	7	2	–	9
SW Oklahoma State	1	–	8	1	–	10
East Central	0	–	9	0	–	11
North Division
Texas A&M–Commerce x	5	–	0	5	–	5
SE Oklahoma State	4	–	1	7	–	4
Central Oklahoma	3	–	2	4	–	7
Northeastern State	2	–	3	2	–	9
SW Oklahoma State	1	–	4	1	–	10
East Central	0	–	5	0	–	11
South Division
No. 10 Tarleton State x+^	4	–	2	10	–	3
No. 14 Midwestern St. x+^	4	–	2	9	–	3
No. 16 Texas A&M–Kingsville x+^	4	–	2	9	–	3
West Texas A&M # x	4	–	2	7	–	5
No. 13 Abilene Christian ^	3	–	3	9	–	4
Angelo State	2	–	4	6	–	5
Eastern New Mexico †	0	–	6	3	–	8
+ – Conference co-champions; ^ – NCAA Division II playoff participant; * – The LSC counted separate overall and division standings. # – Kanza Bowl participant † – Eastern New Mexico vacated all three wins; Rankings from AFCA Poll

The 2009 Texas A&M–Commerce Lions football team represented Texas A&M University-Commerce in the 2009 NCAA Division II football season. They were led by head coach Guy Morriss, who was in his first season at A&M-Commerce. The Lions played their home games at Memorial Stadium and were members of the Lone Star Conference. The Lions finished as Lone Star Conference North Division Champions for the second time in 3 seasons.

== Schedule ==
Date	Time	Opponent	Site	Result	Attendance
August 29	6:00 p.m.	at Angelo State	San Angelo Stadium; San Angelo, TX	L 7–21	6,543
September 5	6:00 p.m.	at Southeastern Louisiana*	Strawberry Stadium; Hammond, LA	L 7–41	5,255
September 12	5:00 p.m.	vs. No. 2 Abilene Christian	Cotton Bowl; Dallas, TX (Harvey Martin Classic)	L 14–20 ^{OT}	7,200
September 19	6:00 p.m.	at Eastern New Mexico	Greyhound Stadium; Portales, NM	L 56–76	2,649
September 26	6:00 p.m.	Central Oklahoma	Memorial Stadium; Commerce, TX	W 27–23	2,413
October 3	6:00 p.m.	Northeastern State	Memorial Stadium; Commerce, TX	W 27–12	1,621
October 10	2:00 p.m.	No. 9 Texas A&M–Kingsville	Memorial Stadium; Commerce, TX (Chennault Cup)	L 34–35	2,406
October 17	2:00 p.m.	East Central	Memorial Stadium; Commerce, TX	W 31–28	2,000
October 31	2:00 p.m.	at Southeastern Oklahoma State	Paul Laird Field; Durant, OK	W 27–17	3,126
November 5	2:00 p.m.	at Southwestern Oklahoma State	Milam Stadium; Weatherford, OK	W 15–12	2,000
*Non-conference game; Rankings from AFCA Poll released prior to the game; All times are in Central time

== Postseason awards ==
=== All-Americans ===
- William Green, First Team Defensive Line

=== LSC superlatives ===
- Coach of The Year: Guy Morriss
- Defensive Lineman of the Year: William Greene
- Linebacker of The Year: Cory Whitfield
- Offensive Lineman of the Year: R.J. Brisbon

=== LSC First Team ===
- Ahmed Abo-Mahmood, Kicker
- R.J. Brisbon, Offensive Line
- Alex Contreras, Safety
- Marcus Graham, Running Back
- William Green, Defensive Line
- Israel Hughes, Defensive Back
- David Sudderth, Offensive Line
- Cory Whitfield, Linebacker

=== LSC Honorable Mention ===
- Stephen DeGrate, Linebacker
- Adam Farkes, Quarterback
- Reid Herchenbach, Tight End
