= 2009 Northwest Missouri State Bearcats football team =

American college football season

2009 Northwest Missouri State Bearcats football

NCAA Division II champion MIAA champion

NCAA Division II Championship Game, W 30–23 vs. Grand Valley State
- Conference: Mid-America Intercollegiate Athletics Association

Ranking
- AFCA: No. 1
- Record: 14–1 (9–0 MIAA)
- Head coach: Mel Tjeerdsma (16th season)
- Offensive coordinator: Adam Dorrel (3rd season)
- Defensive coordinator: Scott Bostwick (16th season)
- Home stadium: Bearcat Stadium

2009 Mid-America Intercollegiate Athletics Association football standings
	Conf.			Overall
Team	W		L	W		L
No. 1 NW Missouri State $^	9	–	0	14	–	1
Missouri Western #	6	–	3	9	–	3
Central Missouri	6	–	3	8	–	3
No. 25 Washburn	6	–	3	8	–	3
Nebraska–Omaha #	6	–	3	7	–	5
Fort Hays State	4	–	5	6	–	5
Pittsburg State	3	–	6	5	–	6
Missouri Southern	3	–	6	3	–	7
Emporia State	1	–	8	2	–	9
Truman	1	–	8	2	–	9
$ – Conference champion; ^ – NCAA Division II playoff participant; # – bowl game participant (Missouri Western: Mineral Water Bowl, Nebraska–Omaha: Kanza Bowl; Rankings from AFCA poll)

The 2009 Northwest Missouri State Bearcats football team was an American football team that won the 2009 NCAA Division II national championship.

The team represented Northwest Missouri State University in the Mid-America Intercollegiate Athletics Association (MIAA) during the 2009 NCAA Division II football season. In their 16th season under head coach Mel Tjeerdsma, the Bearcats compiled a 14–1 record (9–0 against conference opponents) and won the MIAA championship. The team lost the season opener to Abilene Christian and then won 14 consecutive games. The 2009 Bearcats averaged 42 points and 632 yards of offense per game.

The team advanced to the NCAA Division II playoffs and won the national championship by defeating Grand Valley State, 30–23, in the championship game.

The Bearcats' statistical leaders included LaRon Council with 1,819 rushing yards, Blake Bolles with 4,146 passing yards, Jake Soy with 1,559 receiving yards and 162 points scored.

The team played its home games at Bearcat Stadium in Maryville, Missouri.

== Schedule ==
Date	Opponent	Rank	Site	Result	Attendance	Source
August 27	at No. 5 Abilene Christian*	No. 2	Shotwell Stadium; Abiline, TX	L 14–19	11,322	
September 3	at Southwest Baptist*	No. 8	Plaster Stadium; Bolivar, MO	W 49–14	2,953	
September 12	vs. No. 4 Pittsburg State	No. 7	Arrowhead Stadium; Kansas City, MO (rivalry)	W 30–10	20,813	
September 19	Nebraska–Omaha	No. 6	Bearcat Stadium; Maryville, MO	W 37–27	8,820	
September 26	Truman	No. 6	Bearcat Stadium; Maryville, MO (rivalry)	W 70–0	5,678	
October 3	at No. 12 Missouri Western	No. 6	Spratt Stadium; St. Joseph, MO (rivalry)	W 49–35	10,129	
October 10	Missouri Southern	No. 6	Bearcat Stadium; Maryville, MO	W 52–6	4,872	
October 17	at Emporia State	No. 5	Welch Stadium; Emporia, KS	W 45–12	2,835	
October 24	No. 16 Washburn	No. 4	Bearcat Stadium; Maryville, MO	W 22–19	8,704	
October 31	at Fort Hays State	No. 3	Lewis Field Stadium; Hays KS	W 66–40	2,527	
November 7	No. 16 Central Missouri	No. 3	Bearcat Stadium; Maryville, MO	W 56–14	6,643	
November 21	No. 18 Abilene Christian*	No. 2	Bearcat Stadium; Maryville, MO (NCAA Division II first round)	W 35–10	5,893	
November 28	at No. 1 Central Washington*	No. 2	Tomlinson Stadium; Ellensburg, WA (NCAA Division II quarterfinal)	W 21–20	5,625	
December 5	No. 22 California (PA)*	No. 2	Bearcat Stadium; Maryville, MO (NCAA Division II semifinal)	W 56–31	7,122	
December 12	vs. No. 3 Grand Valley State*	No. 2	Braly Municipal Stadium; Florence, AL (NCAA Division II Championship Game)	W 30–23	6,211	
*Non-conference game; Rankings from American Football Coaches Association Poll released prior to the game

== Roster ==
2009 Northwest Missouri State Bearcats football team roster
Players
Coaches
Offense

Pos.	#	Name	Class
WR	1	Jake Soy	So
WR	2	Nick Rhodes	Sr
WR	4	Tyler Shaw	RFr
RB	5	Jordan Simmons	RFr
WR	9	Brian Shannon	Jr
WR	10	Abe Qaoud	Sr
QB	11	Blake Bolles	Jr
WR	12	John Hinchey	RFr
QB	14	Blake Christopher	So
QB	16	Jesse Pierce	Jr
QB	17	Jesse Ver Velde	RFr
RB	25	Previn Perry	So
RB	27	LaRon Council	Sr
RB	28	Kelvin Austin	Jr
RB	31	Billy Creason	RFr
TE	43	Vincent Defeo	RFr
RB	45	Benjamin Pritchett	RFr
TE	46	Nathan Roach	So
RB	47	Ricky Hicks	RFr
OL	53	Robert Stough	RFr
OL	60	Cole Albright	RFr
OL	61	Adam McElderry	So
OL	62	Ross Hastert	Sr
OL	64	Alex Olive	RFr
OL	65	Colby Kamm	RFr
OL	66	Billy Queisert	RFr
OL	70	Brett Grozinger	Jr
OL	71	John Petroff	RFr
OL	72	Ryan Lessman	Jr
OL	73	Jason Wiseman	Jr
OL	74	Rod Williams	RFr
OL	75	Justin Callaway	Jr
OL	76	Cody Johnson	So
OL	77	Dane Wardenburg	Jr
OL	78	Ben Ehret	So
TE	80	Chris Owens	So
TE	81	Brock Houston	Jr
WR	83	James Harris	RFr
TE	84	Ethan Stark	RFr
TE	85	Kyle Kilgore	So
WR	88	Taylor Pierce	So
TE	93	Danny Pestock	So
QB		Trevor Adams	Fr
RB		Kohlman Adema-Schulte	Fr
WR		James Cairney	Fr
OL		Cody Carlson	Fr
OL		Philip Carter	Fr
OL		Cole Daft	Fr
WR		Justin Eiken	Fr
TE		Joel Gantz	Fr
TE		Kyler Hiatt	Fr
OL		Kasey Juhl	Fr
OL		CJ Keeney	Fr
TE		Mitch Masker	Fr
RB		Adam Mattson	Fr
WR		Cole Rosier	Fr
OL		Jake Scarbo	Fr
QB		Tyler Seals	Fr
OL		Travis Shipman	Fr
OL		Matt Sterup	Fr
WR		Clint Utter	Fr
RB		Quincy Williams	Fr

Defense

Pos.	#	Name	Class
CB	3	Ryan Jones	Jr
S	6	Trent Covington	Sr
DB	7	Justin Welch	Jr
S	8	Aldwin Foster-Rettig	Jr
S	13	Nate DeJong	RFr
SS	15	Myles Burnsides	Sr
FS	19	John "Cam" Wierson	Sr
DB	20	Derrick Hightower	So
S	21	Kevin Okonta	So
SS	22	Ikechukwu "Ike" Urum-Eke	Sr
CB	23	E.J. Hawkins	Sr
DB	24	Caleb Decius	So
SS	26	Marciele Surrell	Jr
DB	29	Christian Barksdale	RFr
FS	30	Marcus Martin	Jr
LB	32	Evan Wilmes	Sr
SS	33	Ben Langston	So
CB	34	Clint Moore	Jr
LB	35	Cory Cronk	RFr
DB	36	Charlie Lowe	RFr
LB	37	Bill Baudler	Jr
DB	39	Clark Snodgrass	RFr
LB	40	Joe Bedard	So
LB	41	Landan Zaputil	RFr
LB	42	Tyler Oglesby	RFr
DE	44	Jayson Bates	Sr
LB	48	Dylan Rosier	So
LB	50	Chad Kilgore	So
LB	51	Matt Massey	RFr
LB	52	Willie Horn	Jr
DL	55	Harry McCoy	So
LB	56	Adam Vondrak	Jr
LB	57	Troy Matthews	Jr
DL	58	Darian Skrenes	RFr
DL	59	Ryan Meyer	RFr
LB	68	Collin DeBuysere	RFr
DL	69	Kyle Kleeman	RFr
DL	79	Ryan Arrington	RFr
DB	82	Mike Kuhn	RFr
DE	87	Roberto Davis	Jr
DE	90	Micah Wilson	Jr
DT	91	Tyler Roach	Sr
DE	92	Elliot Easley	Sr
DE	94	Kyle Sunderman	Jr
LB	95	Matthew Meinert	RFr
DE	96	Gary Ewart	RFr
DE	97	Sean Paddock	Sr
DT	98	Shayne Shade	Jr
DL	99	Josh Lorenson	So
DE		Ricky Bailey	Fr
DE		Jake Baumgartner	Fr
DL		Danny Carlson	Fr
DL		Willie Dyson	So
LB		D.J. Gnader	Fr
DB		Darius Hicks	Fr
S		Jeff Howeth	Fr
LB		Bryant Hummel	Fr
DL		Bryce Johnston	Fr
CB		Travis Manning	Fr
LB		Cody Matthewson	Fr
LB		John Schreck	Fr
DE		Payton Scott	Fr
DL		Zach Sherry	Fr
DE		Zach Williams	Fr

Special teams

Pos.	#	Name	Class
P	18	Michael Stadler	Jr
PK	38	Joe Schroeder	Sr
P	49	Todd Adolf	Fr
K		Brian Geraghty	Fr

Head coach

- Mel Tjeerdsma

Coordinators/assistant coaches

- Scott Bostwick – Defensive Coordinator, Linebackers
- Adam Dorrel – Offensive Coordinator, Offensive Line
- Charlie Flohr – Quarterbacks, Recruiting, Passing Game Coordinator
- Will Wagner – Assistant Head Coach, Secondary
- Richard Wright – Defensive Line, Special Teams
- Tyler Martin – Graduate Assistant
- Jeff Kietzman – Graduate Assistant
- Brandon Clayton – Graduate Assistant
- Jared Erspamer – Graduate Assistant
- Joel Osborn – Graduate Assistant
- Jon Goss – Graduate Assistant
- Joe Holtzclaw – Graduate Assistant
- Jordan Brown – Graduate Assistant
- Ramsey Atieh – Student Assistant
- Kyle Dunn – Student Assistant
- Kamron Winchester – Student Assistant
- Alex Autem – Student Assistant
- Andrew Schmitz – Student Assistant
- Cole McCauley – Student Assistant

Legend

- (C) Team captain
- (S) Suspended
- (I) Ineligible
- Injured
- Redshirt

Roster
