= Scott Bostwick =

American football player and coach (1961–2011)

Biographical details
- Born: June 22, 1961; Omaha, Nebraska, U.S.
- Died: June 5, 2011 (aged 49); Maryville, Missouri, U.S.

Playing career
- early 1980s: Nebraska Wesleyan

Coaching career (HC unless noted)
- 1986–1989: Nebraska Wesleyan (DC)
- 1990–1993: Western Washington (DC)
- 1994–2010: Northwest Missouri State (DC)
- 2011: Northwest Missouri State

Accomplishments and honors

Awards
- AFCA Division II Assistant Coach of the Year (2007) Northwest Bearcats M-Club Hall of Fame (2015)

Scott Bostwick (June 22, 1961 – June 5, 2011) was an American football player and coach. He served as the defensive coordinator at Northwest Missouri State University from 1994 to 2010 under head coach Mel Tjeerdsma, during which time the Bearcats captured three NCAA Division II Football Championships, in 1998, 1999, and 2009. In 2007, Bostwick was named the AFCA Division II Assistant Coach of the Year in 2007. He succeeded Tjeerdsma as head coach following the 2010 season, but died of a heart attack the following June.

== Early life and playing career ==
Bostwick was born June 22, 1961, in Omaha, Nebraska, one of the eight children of parents Robert Bostwick and June (Staab) Bostwick Blair. Bostwick was raised in the Omaha area and was a 1979 graduate of Omaha North High School. He then attended Nebraska Wesleyan University, earning a bachelor's degree in 1984. While at Nebraska Wesleyan Bostwick was a four-year letterman in football and finished his playing career as the Prairie Wolves third leading tackler all-time. Bostwick was inducted in the school's athletic hall of fame in October 2006.

== Coaching career ==
Bostwick stayed on as a coaching assistant at Nebraska Wesleyan following graduation, and served as the programs defensive coordinator from 1986 to 1990. He next headed west to Bellingham, Washington, in 1990, taking over as defensive coordinator for Western Washington University until 1994.

=== Building a Bearcat dynasty ===
In 1994, Bostwick's next career move brought his greatest success as he joined new head coach Mel Tjeerdsma as defensive coordinator at Northwest Missouri State University, a member of the Mid-America Intercollegiate Athletics Association (MIAA). The MIAA had already produced several NCAA Division II playoff teams, and one national champion, Pittsburg State in 1991. After a disappointing 0–11 season in 1994, the Bearcats would over the ensuing 16 seasons win or share 12 MIAA conference titles, make the Division II playoffs 15 times, appear in seven national title games and win three NCAA Division II Championships. Bostwick's strong defenses were key to the Bearcats success, allowing only eight opposing players to rush for 100 yards or more over a period of 77 games between 2007 and 2010. For his efforts Bostwick was named the AFCA Division II Assistant Coach of the Year in 2007. Two of Bostwick's defensive players, Dave Tollefson and Steve Williams have gone on to professional football careers in the National Football League (NFL).

=== Appointment as head coach and death ===
On December 31, 2010, Northwest officials announced that Bostwick would succeed the just-retired Tjeerdsma as the Bearcats 18th head coach. Bostwick said he did not even know that Tjeersdma was going to retire until being told the week before his Christmas week announcement. At a press event following his promotion to top Bearcat, Bostwick told the media, "I've been a coordinator for 26 years and if I was ever going to be a head coach, this is where I wanted to be." Bostwick, however, never had the chance to serve Northwest as head coach in an official game. On Sunday morning, June 5, 2011, Bostwick was at home mowing the yard when he collapsed and died of a heart attack.

Three week after Bostwick's death Adam Dorrel, who was the offensive coach under Tjeersdma and who had played with him in the first 1994 0–11 season succeeded Bostwick. Bostwick had earlier named him assistant coach. On July 7 Bostwick's brother Chad Bostwick who had been a walk on player at Northwest under Bostwick was named linebackers coach under Dorrel.

== Personal life ==
Bostwick had three brothers, four sisters, four step-brothers and one step-sister. On December 30, 1988, Bostwick married Susan Duckworth. They had two children, a daughter and a son. Bostwick was a member of St. Gregory Barbargio Catholic Church as well as the Maryville Elks Lodge.
