= 2009 West Texas A&M Buffaloes football team =

American college football season

2009 West Texas A&M Buffaloes football

Kanza Bowl champion

Kanza Bowl, W 31–25 vs. Nebraska–Omaha
- Conference: Lone Star Conference
- South Division
- Record: 7–5 (6–3 LSC)
- Head coach: Don Carthel (5th season)
- Offensive coordinator: Scott Parr (4th season)
- Offensive scheme: Air raid
- Defensive coordinator: Colby Carthel (4th season)
- Base defense: 3–4
- Home stadium: Kimbrough Memorial Stadium

2009 Lone Star Conference football standings
	Conf.			Overall
Team	W		L	W		L
Overall*
No. 10 Tarleton State +^	7	–	2	10	–	3
No. 14 Midwestern St. +^	7	–	2	9	–	3
No. 16 Texas A&M–Kingsville +^	7	–	2	9	–	3
No. 13 Abilene Christian ^	6	–	3	9	–	4
West Texas A&M #	6	–	3	7	–	5
SE Oklahoma State	5	–	4	7	–	4
Angelo State	5	–	4	6	–	5
Texas A&M–Commerce	5	–	4	5	–	5
Central Oklahoma	4	–	5	4	–	7
Eastern New Mexico †	2	–	7	3	–	8
Northeastern State	2	–	7	2	–	9
SW Oklahoma State	1	–	8	1	–	10
East Central	0	–	9	0	–	11
North Division
Texas A&M–Commerce x	5	–	0	5	–	5
SE Oklahoma State	4	–	1	7	–	4
Central Oklahoma	3	–	2	4	–	7
Northeastern State	2	–	3	2	–	9
SW Oklahoma State	1	–	4	1	–	10
East Central	0	–	5	0	–	11
South Division
No. 10 Tarleton State x+^	4	–	2	10	–	3
No. 14 Midwestern St. x+^	4	–	2	9	–	3
No. 16 Texas A&M–Kingsville x+^	4	–	2	9	–	3
West Texas A&M # x	4	–	2	7	–	5
No. 13 Abilene Christian ^	3	–	3	9	–	4
Angelo State	2	–	4	6	–	5
Eastern New Mexico †	0	–	6	3	–	8
+ – Conference co-champions; ^ – NCAA Division II playoff participant; * – The LSC counted separate overall and division standings. # – Kanza Bowl participant † – Eastern New Mexico vacated all three wins; Rankings from AFCA Poll

The 2009 West Texas A&M Buffaloes football team represented West Texas A&M University during the 2009 NCAA Division II football season as a member of the Lone Star Conference (LSC). The Buffaloes were led by fifth-year head coach Don Carthel and played their home games at Kimbrough Memorial Stadium in Canyon, Texas.

West Texas finished the season with an overall record of 7–5 with a conference record of 6–3. For the first time under Carthel, the Buffs failed to receive an invitation to the NCAA Division II playoffs. Instead, the team was invited to the inaugural Kanza Bowl, where they defeated Nebraska–Omaha by a score of 31–25.

== Schedule ==
Date	Time	Opponent	Rank	Site	Result
August 29	6:00 p.m.	No. 1 Grand Valley State*	No. 11	Kimbrough Memorial Stadium; Canyon, TX	L 23–37
September 5	6:00 p.m.	Central Oklahoma	No. 13	Kimbrough Memorial Stadium; Canyon, TX	L 17–24
September 12	3:00 p.m.	at No. 6 Central Washington*		Tomlinson Stadium; Ellensburg, WA	L 10–34
September 19	6:00 p.m.	at SW Oklahoma State		Milam Stadium; Weatherford, OK	W 41–15
September 26	6:00 p.m.	No. 10 Texas A&M–Kingsville		Kimbrough Memorial Stadium; Canyon, TX	L 16–23 ^{OT}
October 3	7:00 p.m.	at No. 23 Midwestern State		Memorial Stadium; Wichita Falls, TX	L 19–31
October 10	6:00 p.m.	Eastern New Mexico^{†}		Kimbrough Memorial Stadium; Canyon, TX (Wagon Wheel)	W 34–24
October 17	2:00 p.m.	at No. 1 Abilene Christian		Shotwell Stadium; Abilene, TX	W 32–21
October 24	6:00 p.m.	Angelo State		Kimbrough Memorial Stadium; Canyon, TX	W 43–15
October 31	7:00 p.m.	at Northeastern State		Doc Wadley Stadium; Tahlequah, OK	W 66–23
November 7	7:00 p.m.	at No. 7 Tarleton State		Memorial Stadium; Stephenville, TX	W 49–35
December 5	1:00 p.m.	vs. Nebraska–Omaha*		Hummer Sports Complex; Topeka, KS (Kanza Bowl)	W 31–25
*Non-conference game; ^{†}Homecoming; Rankings from AFCA Poll released prior to the game; All times are in Central time

== Rankings ==
Ranking movements Legend: ██ Increase in ranking ██ Decrease in ranking — = Not ranked
	Week													
Poll	Pre	1	2	3	4	5	6	7	8	9	10	11	12	Final
AFCA	11	13	—	—	—	—	—	—	—	—	—	—	—	—

== Game summaries ==
=== No. 1 Grand Valley State ===
No. 1 Grand Valley State Lakers at No. 11 West Texas A&M Buffaloes – Game summary

Quarter	1	2	3	4	Total
No. 1 Lakers	7	7	20	3	37
No. 11 Buffaloes	7	2	7	7	23

at Kimbrough Memorial Stadium, Canyon, Texas

- Date: August 29
- Game time: 6:00 p.m. CDT
- Game weather: Clear, 81 °F (27 °C)
- Game attendance: 15,093
- Referee: Robert Dalton
- GV box score

Game information
First quarter
- GV – Andrew Lorman 18-yard pass from Brad Iciek (Justin Trumble kick), 10:18. Lakers 7–0. Drive: 11 plays, 80 yards, 4:42.
- WT – Tyson Williams 5-yard pass from Taylor Harris (James Chandler kick), 1:11. Tied 7–7. Drive: 9 plays, 58 yards, 4:30.

Second quarter

- WT – Brad Iciek sacked in own end zone, 7:57. Buffaloes 9–7.
- GV – Blake Smolen 46-yard pass from Brad Iciek (Justin Trumble kick), 0:07. Lakers 14–9. Drive: 5 plays, 74 yards, 2:14.

Third quarter

- GV – Brad Iciek 5-yard run (Justin Trumble kick), 10:20. Lakers 21–9. Drive: 6 plays, 61 yards, 2:42.
- GV – Mike Koster 2-yard pass from Brad Iciek (Justin Trumble kick), 7:15. Lakers 28–9. Drive: 3 plays, 39 yards, 1:11.
- GV – Luther Ware 72-yard fumble return (kick blocked), 3:11. Lakers 34–9.
- WT – Wade Langley 7-yard pass from Taylor Harris (James Chandler kick), 0:48. Lakers 34–16. Drive: 6 plays, 57 yards, 2:15.

Fourth quarter

- GV – Justin Trumble 23-yard field goal, 8:47. Lakers 37–16. Drive: 15 plays, 60 yards, 6:53.
- WT – Brittan Golden 12-yard pass from Tanner Marsh (James Chandler kick), 0:41. Lakers 37–23. Drive: 10 plays, 79 yards, 1:42.

Statistics	GV	WT
First downs	16	25
Total yards	382	426
Rushing yards	156	44
Passing yards	226	382
Turnovers	1	4
Time of possession	29:38	30:22

Team	Category	Player	Statistics
Grand Valley State	Passing	Brad Iciek	17/25, 226 yards, 3 TD
Grand Valley State	Rushing	James Berezik	19 rushes, 95 yards
Grand Valley State	Receiving	Mike Koster	7 receptions, 68 yards, TD
West Texas A&M	Passing	Taylor Harris	34/46, 306 yards, 2 TD, INT
West Texas A&M	Rushing	Kelvin Thompson	10 rushes, 54 yards
West Texas A&M	Receiving	Tyson Williams	8 receptions, 92 yards, TD

=== At No. 6 Central Washington ===
West Texas A&M Buffaloes at No. 6 Central Washington Wildcats – Game summary

Quarter	1	2	3	4	Total
Buffaloes	3	0	0	7	10
No. 6 Wildcats	14	17	0	3	34

at Tomlinson Stadium, Ellensburg, Washington

- Date: September 12
- Game time: 2,977
- Game weather: Sunny, 83 °F (28 °C)
- Game attendance: 2,977
- Referee: Jeff Sadorus
- Box score

Game information
First quarter
- CWU – Jamal Weems 1-yard pass from Ryan Robertson (Garrett Rolsma kick), 9:57. Wildcats 7–0. Drive: 5 plays, 64 yards, 1:58.
- CWU – Justin Helwege 2-yard pass from Ryan Robertson (Garret Rolsma kick), 4:09. Wildcats 14–0. Drive: 9 plays, 63 yards, 4:11.
- WT – James Chandler 23-yard field goal, 0:05. Wildcats 14–3. Drive: 9 plays, 66 yards, 3:55.

Second quarter

- CWU – Johnny Spevak 20-yard pass from Ryan Robertson (Garrett Rolsma kick), 10:24. Wildcats 21–3. Drive: 12 plays, 84 yards, 4:36.
- CWU – Reggie Westmoreland 25-yard pass from Ryan Robertson (Garrett Rolsma kick), 6:22. Wildcats 28–3. Drive: 5 plays, 48 yards, 2:12.
- CWU – Garrett Rolsma 18-yard field goal, 0:07. Wildcats 31–3. Drive: 10 plays, 50 yards, 4:45.

Third quarter

- No scoring plays

Fourth quarter

- WT – Josephius Martin 16-yard pass from Taylor Harris (James Chandler kick), 13:04. Wildcats 31–10. Drive: 9 plays, 80 yards, 2:35.
- CWU – Garrett Rolsma 37-yard field goal, 2:32. Wildcats 34–10. Drive: 4 plays, 4 yards, 1:21.

Statistics	WT	CWU
First downs	12	22
Total yards	230	366
Rushing yards	56	110
Passing yards	174	256
Turnovers	1	0
Time of possession	26:41	33:19

Team	Category	Player	Statistics
West Texas A&M	Passing	Taylor Harris	23/38, 174 yards, TD
West Texas A&M	Rushing	Kelvin Thompson	16 rushes, 81 yards
West Texas A&M	Receiving	Stephen Burton	7 receptions, 59 yards
Central Washington	Passing	Ryan Robertson	21/36, 256 yards, 4 TD
Central Washington	Rushing	Randall Eldridge	15 rushes, 64 yards
Central Washington	Receiving	Johnny Spevak	9 receptions, 121 yards, TD

=== At No. 1 Abilene Christian ===
West Texas A&M Buffaloes at No. 1 Abilene Christian Wildcats – Game summary

Quarter	1	2	3	4	Total
Buffaloes	3	9	6	14	32
No. 1 Wildcats	7	7	0	7	21

at Shotwell Stadium, Abilene, Texas

- Date: October 17
- Game time: 2:00 p.m. CDT
- Game weather: Clear, 60 °F (16 °C)
- Game attendance: 12,875
- Referee: Eddy Shelton
- Box score

Game information
First quarter
- WT – James Chandler 28-yard field goal, 10:27. Buffaloes 3–0. Drive: 10 plays, 25 yards, 3:45.
- ACU – Reggie Brown 1-yard run (Morgan Lineberry kick), 0:45. Wildcats 7–3. Drive: 12 plays, 54 yards, 5:19.

Second quarter

- WT – Daryl Richardson tackled in own end zone, 6:24. Wildcats 7–5.
- WT – Keithon Flemming 1-yard run (James Chandler kick), 4:17. Buffaloes 12–7. Drive: 6 plays, 56 yards, 2:07.
- ACU – Daryl Richardson 1-yard run (Morgan Lineberry kick), 0:14. Wildcats 14–12. Drive: 13 plays, 67 yards, 4:03.

Third quarter

- WT – Keithon Flemming 8-yard pass from Taylor Harris (pass failed), 5:05. Buffaloes 18–14. Drive: 9 plays, 80 yards, 2:44.

Fourth quarter

- ACU – Daryl Richardson 4-yard run (Morgan Lineberry kick), 14:26. Wildcats 21–18. Drive: 11 plays, 74 yards, 5:39.
- WT – Keithon Flemming 4-yard run (Jason Chandler kick), 7:49. Buffaloes 25–21. Drive: 7 plays, 29 yards, 2:26.
- WT – Keithon Flemming 6-yard pass from Taylor Rogers (Jason Chandler kick), 2:10. Buffaloes 32–21. Drive: 9 plays, 77 yards, 3:58.

Statistics	WT	ACU
First downs	21	18
Total yards	383	301
Rushing yards	25	189
Passing yards	358	112
Turnovers	0	2
Time of possession	28:11	31:49

Team	Category	Player	Statistics
West Texas A&M	Passing	Taylor Harris	34/48, 358 yards, 2 TD
West Texas A&M	Rushing	Keithon Flemming	11 rushes, 72 yards, 2 TD
West Texas A&M	Receiving	Stephen Burton	8 receptions, 115 yards
Abilene Christian	Passing	Mitchell Gale	14/25, 112 yards, 2 INT
Abilene Christian	Rushing	Daryl Richardson	22 rushes, 100 yards, 2 TD
Abilene Christian	Receiving	Dennis Campbell	3 receptions, 43 yards

=== Vs. Nebraska–Omaha (Kanza Bowl) ===
2009 Kanza Bowl
West Texas A&M Buffaloes vs. Nebraska–Omaha Mavericks – Game summary

Quarter	1	2	3	4	Total
Buffaloes	7	3	14	7	31
Mavericks	0	9	7	9	25

at Hummer Sports Complex, Topeka, Kansas

- Date: December 5
- Game time: 1:00 p.m. CST
- Game weather: Sunny, 41 °F (5 °C)
- Game attendance: 3,032
- Referee: Danny Harris
- Box score

Game information
First quarter
- WT – Keithon Flemming 1-yard run (James Chandler kick), 4:35. Buffaloes 7–0. Drive: 2 plays, 36 yards, 0:16.

Second quarter

- UNO – Greg Zuerlein 23-yard field goal, 12:56. Buffaloes 7–3. Drive: 14 plays, 69 yards, 6:39.
- UNO – Greg Zuerlein 52-yard field goal, 11:32. Buffaloes 7–6. Drive: 4 plays, 2 yards, 0:59.
- UNO – Greg Zuerlein 27-yard field goal, 1:55. Mavericks 9–7. Drive: 9 plays, 40 yards, 4:54.
- WT – James Chandler 32-yard field goal, 0:00. Buffaloes 10–9. Drive: 6 plays, 70 yards, 1:40.

Third quarter

- UNO – Kyle Moore 23-yard interception return (Greg Zuerlein kick), 14:51. Mavericks 16–10.
- WT – Tyson Williams 15-yard run (James Chandler kick), 8:29. Buffaloes 17–16. Drive: 6 plays, 80 yards, 1:57.
- WT – Keithon Flemming 40-yard pass from Taylor Harris (James Chandler kick), 4:57. Buffaloes 24–16. Drive: 1 play, 40 yards, 0:10.

Fourth quarter

- UNO – Duane Bowen 2-yard run (pass failed), 9:34. Buffaloes 24–22. Drive: 9 plays, 46 yards, 3:56.
- WT – Brittan Golden 38-yard pass from Taylor Harris (James Chandler kick), 8:23. Buffaloes 31–22. Drive: 4 plays, 50 yards, 1:01.
- UNO – Greg Zuerlein 40-yard field goal, 2:58. Buffaloes 31–25. Drive: 14 plays, 61 yards, 5:21.

Statistics	WT	UNO
First downs	14	22
Total yards	352	367
Rushing yards	70	115
Passing yards	282	252
Turnovers	2	1
Time of possession	16:50	43:10

Team	Category	Player	Statistics
West Texas A&M	Passing	Taylor Harris	15/29, 282 yards, 2 TD, 2 INT
West Texas A&M	Rushing	Keithon Flemming	14 rushes, 42 yards, TD
West Texas A&M	Receiving	Brittan Golden	5 receptions, 119 yards, TD
Nebraska–Omaha	Passing	Greg Wunderlich	26/44, 252 yards, INT
Nebraska–Omaha	Rushing	Levi Terrell	28 rushes, 84 yards
Nebraska–Omaha	Receiving	Mike Higgins	7 receptions, 78 yards
