= Chad Kilgore =

American gridiron football player (born 1989)

No. 50
- Position: Linebacker

Personal information
- Born: August 8, 1989 (age 37); Orrick, Missouri, U.S.
- Listed height: 6 ft 1 in (1.85 m)
- Listed weight: 230 lb (104 kg)

Career information
- High school: Excelsior Springs (MO)
- College: Northwest Missouri State
- NFL draft: 2012: undrafted

Career history
- Oakland Raiders (2012)*; Sacramento Mountain Lions (2012); Saskatchewan Roughriders (2013)*; Kansas City Chiefs (2013)*; Saskatchewan Roughriders (2014–2015)
- * Offseason or practice squad member only

Awards and highlights
- NCAA Division II national champion (2009)
- Stats at CFL.ca (archive)

Chad Kilgore (born August 8, 1989) is an American former professional football linebacker. He played college football at Northwest Missouri State University. He was a member of the Oakland Raiders, Sacramento Mountain Lions, Saskatchewan Roughriders and Kansas City Chiefs.

== Early life ==
Kilgore played high school football at Excelsior Springs High School in Excelsior Springs, Missouri. He was a first-team all-state linebacker, first-team all-district and all-conference linebacker and running back. He was also a team captain for the Tigers. He earned all-state, all-district and all-conference honors as a linebacker in 2006.

== College career ==
Kilgore played football for the Northwest Missouri State Bearcats. He was named defensive MVP of the Bearcats as a junior. Kilgore was named first-team All-MIAA as a sophomore. He was also named Redshirt Freshman of the Year. He finished his college career with 392 tackles, 21.5 tackles for loss, 21 pass knockdowns, five forced fumbles, five interceptions, and 5.5 quarterback sacks.

== Professional career ==
Kilgore was signed by the Oakland Raiders of the National Football League (NFL) on July 29, 2012 after going undrafted in the 2012 NFL draft. He was released by the Raiders on August 31, 2012.

Kilgore spent the 2012 season with the Sacramento Mountain Lions of the United Football League. The 2012 season was halted early due to league financial difficulties, and Kilgore said it was obvious that there were money problems with the league. He said that the "whole demeanor of the team was, 'This is a joke.'"

Kilgore signed with the Saskatchewan Roughriders of the Canadian Football League (CFL) in December 2012. He was signed by the NFL's Kansas City Chiefs on March 27, 2013. He approached Saskatchewan leadership about getting out of his contract. Kilgore said they "were extremely cool about it" and indicated that the Roughriders would like to have him rejoin the team if he did not succeed in the NFL. He was released by the Chiefs on August 14, 2013. Upon his release, Kilgore was described as having been a longshot to make the roster. He was waived in order to clear roster space for cornerback Kennard Cox.

Kilgore signed with the Roughriders on March 6, 2014. He suffered a broken thumb in a June 2014 preseason game and the team placed him on the six-game injured list. He was released by the Roughriders on August 7, 2015.
