= 2009 Grand Valley State Lakers football team =

American college football season

2009 Grand Valley State Lakers football

GLIAC champion

NCAA Division II Championship Game, L 23–30 vs. Northwest Missouri State
- Conference: Great Lakes Intercollegiate Athletic Conference

Ranking
- AFCA: No. 2
- Record: 13–2 (9–1 GLIAC)
- Head coach: Chuck Martin (6th season)
- Offensive coordinator: Eric Koehler (2nd season)
- Offensive scheme: No-huddle, one back
- Defensive coordinator: Matt Mitchell (2nd season)
- Base defense: 4–3
- Home stadium: Lubbers Stadium

2009 Great Lakes Intercollegiate Athletic Conference football standings
	Conf.			Overall
Team	W		L	W		L
No. 2 Grand Valley State $^	9	–	1	13	–	2
No. 11 Hillsdale ^	8	–	2	10	–	3
No. 19 Saginaw Valley State ^	8	–	2	9	–	3
Northwood	7	–	3	7	–	3
Findlay	6	–	4	7	–	4
Northern Michigan	6	–	4	6	–	4
Ashland	6	–	4	6	–	5
Wayne State (MI)	5	–	5	6	–	5
Indianapolis	3	–	7	4	–	7
Michigan Tech	2	–	8	2	–	8
Ferris State	0	–	10	1	–	10
Tiffin	0	–	10	0	–	11
$ – Conference champion; ^ – NCAA Division II playoff participant; Rankings from AFCA poll

The 2009 Grand Valley State Lakers football team was an American football team that represented Grand Valley State University in the Great Lakes Intercollegiate Athletic Conference (GLIAC) during the 2009 NCAA Division II football season. In their sixth season under head coach Chuck Martin, the Lakers compiled a 13–2 record (9–1 against conference opponents), won the GLIAC championship for the fifth consecutive season, and qualified for the NCAA Division II playoff for the ninth straight year.

In the playoffs, the Lakers received a bye in the first round and won in the second round, quarterfinals, and semifinals before losing to Northwest Missouri State in the national championship game.

Statistical leaders included James Berezik with 1,280 rushing yards, Brad Iciek with 3,194 passing yards, Blake Somlen with 917 receiving yards, and Justin Trumble with 107 points scored (18 field goals and 53 points after touchdown).

The team played its home games at Lubbers Stadium in Allendale Charter Township, Michigan.

== Schedule ==
Date	Time	Opponent	Rank	Site	Result	Attendance
August 29	7:00 p.m.	at No. 11 West Texas A&M*	No. 1	Kimbrough Memorial Stadium; Canyon, TX	W 37–23	15,093
September 5	6:00 p.m.	at Indianapolis	No. 1	Key Stadium; Indianapolis, IN	W 26–10	4,802
September 12	7:00 p.m.	No. 16 Saginaw Valley State	No. 1	Lubbers Stadium; Allendale, MI (Battle of the Valleys)	W 38–7	16,467
September 19	7:00 p.m.	at Ferris State	No. 1	Top Taggert Field; Big Rapids, MI (Anchor–Bone Classic)	W 17–10	4,290
September 26	6:00 p.m.	at Michigan Tech	No. 1	Sherman Field; Houghton, MI	W 55–7	2,639
October 3	7:00 p.m.	Tiffin	No. 1	Lubbers Stadium; Allendale, MI	W 47–21	11,299
October 10	2:30 p.m.	at Hillsdale	No. 1	Muddy Waters Stadium; Hillsdale, MI	L 24–27	3,116
October 17	7:00 p.m.	No. 18 Findlay^{†}	No. 8	Lubbers Stadium; Allendale, MI	W 38–13	11,428
October 24	1:00 p.m.	at Ashland	No. 6	Jack Miller Stadium; Ashland, OH	W 34–7	3,491
October 31	7:00 p.m.	Northern Michigan	No. 5	Lubbers Stadium; Allendale, MI	W 31–19	6,633
November 7	1:00 p.m.	Wayne State (MI)	No. 5	Lubbers Stadium; Allendale, MI	W 59–28	8,397
November 21	1:00 p.m.	No. 15 Hillsdale*	No. 3	Lubbers Stadium; Allendale, MI (NCAA Division II Second Round)	W 44–27	8,229
November 28	1:00 p.m.	at No. 4 Minnesota Duluth*	No. 3	Malosky Stadium; Duluth, MN (NCAA Division II Quarterfinals)	W 24–10	4,211
December 5	3:30 p.m.	No. 10 Carson–Newman*	No. 3	Lubbers Stadium; Allendale, MI (NCAA Division II Semifinals)	W 41–27	7,247
December 12	1:00 p.m.	vs. No. 2 Northwest Missouri State*	No. 3	Braly Municipal Stadium; Florence, AL (NCAA Division II Championship Game)	L 23–30	6,211
*Non-conference game; ^{†}Homecoming; Rankings from AFCA Poll released prior to the game; All times are in Eastern time

== Rankings ==
Ranking movements Legend: ██ Increase in ranking ██ Decrease in ranking ( ) = First-place votes
	Week													
Poll	Pre	1	2	3	4	5	6	7	8	9	10	11	12	Final
AFCA	1 (12)	1 (21)	1 (25)	1 (25)	1 (24)	1 (24)	1 (24)	8	6	5	5	5	3	2

== Game summaries ==
=== At No. 11 West Texas A&M ===
No. 1 Grand Valley State Lakers at No. 11 West Texas A&M Buffaloes – Game summary

Quarter	1	2	3	4	Total
No. 1 Lakers	7	7	20	3	37
No. 11 Buffaloes	7	2	7	7	23

at Kimbrough Memorial Stadium, Canyon, Texas

- Date: August 29
- Game time: 7:00 p.m. EDT/6:00 p.m. CDT
- Game weather: Clear, 81 °F (27 °C)
- Game attendance: 15,093
- Referee: Robert Dalton
- Box score, Recap

Game information
First quarter
- GV – Andrew Lorman 18-yard pass from Brad Iciek (Justin Trumble kick), 10:18. Lakers 7–0. Drive: 11 plays, 80 yards, 4:42.
- WT – Tyson Williams 5-yard pass from Taylor Harris (James Chandler kick), 1:11. Tied 7–7. Drive: 9 plays, 58 yards, 4:30.

Second quarter

- WT – Brad Iciek sacked in own end zone, 7:57. Buffaloes 9–7.
- GV – Blake Smolen 46-yard pass from Brad Iciek (Justin Trumble kick), 0:07. Lakers 14–9. Drive: 5 plays, 74 yards, 2:14.

Third quarter

- GV – Brad Iciek 5-yard run (Justin Trumble kick), 10:20. Lakers 21–9. Drive: 6 plays, 61 yards, 2:42.
- GV – Mike Koster 2-yard pass from Brad Iciek (Justin Trumble kick), 7:15. Lakers 28–9. Drive: 3 plays, 39 yards, 1:11.
- GV – Luther Ware 72-yard fumble return (kick blocked), 3:11. Lakers 34–9.
- WT – Wade Langley 7-yard pass from Taylor Harris (James Chandler kick), 0:48. Lakers 34–16. Drive: 6 plays, 57 yards, 2:15.

Fourth quarter

- GV – Justin Trumble 23-yard field goal, 8:47. Lakers 37–16. Drive: 15 plays, 60 yards, 6:53.
- WT – Brittan Golden 12-yard pass from Tanner Marsh (James Chandler kick), 0:41. Lakers 37–23. Drive: 10 plays, 79 yards, 1:42.

Statistics	GV	WT
First downs	16	25
Total yards	382	426
Rushing yards	156	44
Passing yards	226	382
Turnovers	1	4
Time of possession	29:38	30:22

Team	Category	Player	Statistics
Grand Valley State	Passing	Brad Iciek	17/25, 226 yards, 3 TD
Grand Valley State	Rushing	James Berezik	19 rushes, 95 yards
Grand Valley State	Receiving	Mike Koster	7 receptions, 68 yards, TD
West Texas A&M	Passing	Taylor Harris	34/46, 306 yards, 2 TD, INT
West Texas A&M	Rushing	Kelvin Thompson	10 rushes, 54 yards
West Texas A&M	Receiving	Tyson Williams	8 receptions, 92 yards, TD

=== At Indianapolis ===
No. 1 Grand Valley State Lakers at Indianapolis Greyhounds – Game summary

Quarter	1	2	3	4	Total
No. 1 Lakers	6	17	0	3	26
Greyhounds	7	0	0	3	10

at Key Stadium, Indianapolis, Indiana

- Date: September 5
- Game time: 6:00 p.m. EDT
- Game weather: Mild, 70 °F (21 °C)
- Game attendance: 4,802
- Referee: Mike McCann
- Box score, Recap

Game information
First quarter
- GV – Andrew Lorman 9-yard pass from Brad Iciek (kick failed), 12:10. Lakers 6–0. Drive: 8 plays, 64 yards, 2:50.
- UI – Halston Love 74-yard pass from Rob Doyle (Jace Morrison kick), 11:09. Greyhounds 7–6. Drive: 3 plays, 78 yards, 0:55.

Second quarter

- GV – Justin Trumble 22-yard field goal, 6:43. Lakers 9–7. Drive: 11 plays, 33 yards, 4:26.
- GV – P. T. Gates 8-yard run (Justin Trumble kick), 2:23. Lakers 16–7. Drive: 5 plays, 42 yards, 1:58.
- GV – Mike Koster 5-yard pass from Brad Iciek (Justin Trumble kick), 0:51. Lakers 23–7. Drive: 3 plays, 48 yards, 0:25.

Third quarter

- No scoring plays

Fourth quarter

- GV – Justin Trumble 30-yard field goal, 14:50. Lakers 26–7. Drive: 6 plays, 38 yards, 1:59.
- UI – Jace Morrison 20-yard field goal, 9:17. Lakers 26–10. Drive: 11 plays, 71 yards, 5:23.

Statistics	GV	UI
First downs	23	11
Total yards	414	273
Rushing yards	174	11
Passing yards	240	262
Turnovers	0	1
Time of possession	32:50	27:10

Team	Category	Player	Statistics
Grand Valley State	Passing	Brad Iciek	19/36, 240 yards, 2 TD
Grand Valley State	Rushing	James Berezik	20 rushes, 101 yards
Grand Valley State	Receiving	Mike Koster	5 receptions, 68 yards, TD
Indianapolis	Passing	Rob Doyle	25/36, 262 yards, TD
Indianapolis	Rushing	Willis Brucker	2 rushes, 23 yards
Indianapolis	Receiving	Halston Love	7 receptions, 108 yards, TD

=== No. 16 Saginaw Valley State ===
No. 16 Saginaw Valley State Cardinals at No. 1 Grand Valley State Lakers – Game summary

Quarter	1	2	3	4	Total
No. 16 Cardinals	0	7	0	0	7
No. 1 Lakers	17	14	7	0	38

at Lubbers Stadium, Allendale, Michigan

- Date: September 12
- Game time: 7:00 p.m. EDT
- Game weather: Sunny and calm, 71 °F (22 °C)
- Game attendance: 16,467
- Referee: David Siegle
- Box score, Recap

Game information
First quarter
- GV – Justin Trumble 21-yard field goal, 10:59. Lakers 3–0. Drive: 9 plays, 53 yards, 4:01.
- GV – Mike Koster 16-yard pass from Brad Iciek (Justin Trumble kick), 5:59. Lakers 10–0. Drive: 8 plays, 77 yards, 4:01.
- GV – Blake Smolen 64-yard pass from Brad Iciek (Justin Trumble kick), 4:44. Lakers 17–0. Drive: 1 play, 64 yards, 0:10.

Second quarter

- GV – P. T. Gates 29-yard pass from Brad Iciek (Justin Trumble kick), 10:33. Lakers 24–0. Drive: 3 plays, 47 yards, 0:42.
- SV – Galen Stone 12-yard pass from Charles Dowdell (Austin Brochard kick), 6:47. Lakers 24–7. Drive: 9 plays, 66 yards, 3:46.
- GV – Blake Smolen 15-yard pass from Brad Iciek (Justin Trumble kick), 1:26. Lakers 31–7. Drive: 11 plays, 60 yards, 5:21.

Third quarter

- GV – Ryan Bass 52-yard pass from Brad Iciek (Justin Trumble kick), 1:49. Lakers 38–7. Drive: 6 plays, 68 yards, 2:49.

Fourth quarter

- No scoring plays

Statistics	SV	GV
First downs	20	18
Total yards	370	464
Rushing yards	170	99
Passing yards	200	365
Turnovers	3	1
Time of possession	31:41	28:19

Team	Category	Player	Statistics
Saginaw Valley State	Passing	Charles Dowdell	18/36, 200 yards, TD, 3 INT
Saginaw Valley State	Rushing	Charles Dowdell	14 rushes, 48 yards
Saginaw Valley State	Receiving	Galen Stone	5 receptions, 85 yards, TD
Grand Valley State	Passing	Brad Iciek	18/27, 336 yards, 5 TD
Grand Valley State	Rushing	James Berezik	12 rushes, 74 yards
Grand Valley State	Receiving	Blake Smolen	6 receptions, 112 yards, 2 TD

=== At Ferris State ===
No. 1 Grand Valley State Lakers at Ferris State Bulldogs – Game summary

Quarter	1	2	3	4	Total
No. 1 Lakers	7	3	0	7	17
Bulldogs	0	3	0	7	10

at Top Taggert Field, Big Rapids, Michigan

- Date: September 19
- Game time: 7:00 p.m. EDT
- Game weather: Clear, 66 °F (19 °C)
- Game attendance: 4,290
- Referee: David Siegle
- Box score, Recap

Game information
First quarter
- GV – Mike Koster 5-yard pass from Brad Iciek (Justin Trumble kick), 4:53. Lakers 7–0. Drive: 8 plays, 77 yards, 4:01.

Second quarter

- GV – Justin Trumble 22-yard field goal, 7:22. Lakers 10–0. Drive: 7 plays, 49 yards, 1:47.
- FS – Shawn Snoor 45-yard field goal, 5:16. Lakers 10–3. Drive: 6 plays, 34 yards, 1:59.

Third quarter

- No scoring plays

Fourth quarter

- FS – Tyler Thomas 2-yard run (Shawn Snoor kick), 12:44. Tied 10–10. Drive: 4 plays, 80 yards, 2:02.
- GV – Mike Koster 9-yard pass from Brad Iciek (Justin Trumble kick), 4:13. Lakers 17–10. Drive: 8 plays, 56 yards, 4:44.

Statistics	GV	FS
First downs	23	10
Total yards	400	210
Rushing yards	214	108
Passing yards	186	102
Turnovers	1	0
Time of possession	33:38	26:22

Team	Category	Player	Statistics
Grand Valley State	Passing	Brad Iciek	16/27, 186 yards, 2 TD
Grand Valley State	Rushing	James Berezik	29 rushes, 178 yards
Grand Valley State	Receiving	Mike Koster	6 receptions, 51 yards, 2 TD
Ferris State	Passing	Kyle Parrish	4/9, 102 yards
Ferris State	Rushing	David Freeman	11 rushes, 70 yards
Ferris State	Receiving	Aaron Olman	2 receptions, 86 yards

=== At Michigan Tech ===
No. 1 Grand Valley State Lakers at Michigan Tech Huskies – Game summary

Quarter	1	2	3	4	Total
No. 1 Lakers	21	20	7	7	55
Huskies	0	7	0	0	7

at Sherman Field, Houghton, Michigan

- Date: September 26
- Game time: 1:00 p.m. EDT
- Game weather: Partly cloudy, 62 °F (17 °C)
- Game attendance: 2,639
- Referee: Jeff Servenski
- Box score, Recap

Game information
First quarter
- GV – James Berezik 1-yard run (Justin Trumble kick), 14:01. Lakers 7–0. Drive: 2 plays, 10 yards, 0:59.
- GV – Mike Koster 10-yard pass from Brad Iciek (Justin Trumble kick), 8:31. Lakers 14–0. Drive: 9 plays, 87 yards, 4:16.
- GV – Ryan Bass 26-yard pass from Brad Iciek (Justin Trumble kick), 1:26. Lakers 21–0. Drive: 1 plays, 26 yards, 0:07.

Second quarter

- MT – Bryan LaChapelle 9-yard pass from Brent Heim (Tyler Cattelino kick), 12:00. Lakers 21–7. Drive: 8 plays, 70 yards, 4:19.
- GV – Ryan Bass 33-yard pass from Brad Iciek (Justin Trumble kick), 9:23. Lakers 28–7. Drive: 5 plays, 60 yards, 2:32.
- GV – P. T. Gates 1-yard run (Justin Trumble kick), 5:15. Lakers 35–7. Drive: 6 plays, 48 yards, 2:42.
- GV – Blair Hollis 20-yard fumble return (kick failed), 3:44. Lakers 41–7.

Third quarter

- GV – Justin Sherrod 40-yard run (Jay Jandasek kick), 2:02. Lakers 48–7. Drive: 6 plays, 84 yards, 2:39.

Fourth quarter

- GV – Carlos Clark 1-yard run (Jay Jandasek kick), 1:46. Lakers 55–7. Drive: 11 plays, 96 yards, 6:56.

Statistics	GV	MT
First downs	25	22
Total yards	496	294
Rushing yards	311	92
Passing yards	185	203
Turnovers	1	4
Time of possession	30:30	29:30

Team	Category	Player	Statistics
Grand Valley State	Passing	Brad Iciek	6/9, 107 yards, 3 TD
Grand Valley State	Rushing	P. T. Gates	10 rushes, 108 yards, TD
Grand Valley State	Receiving	Ryan Bass	2 receptions, 59 yards, 2 TD
Michigan Tech	Passing	Brent Heim	20/31, 203 yards, TD, 2 INT
Michigan Tech	Rushing	Marvin Atkins	17 rushes, 100 yards
Michigan Tech	Receiving	Bobby Slowik	5 receptions, 104 yards

=== Tiffin ===
Tiffin Dragons at No. 1 Grand Valley State Lakers – Game summary

Quarter	1	2	3	4	Total
Dragons	0	7	14	0	21
No. 1 Lakers	28	13	6	0	47

at Lubbers Stadium, Allendale, Michigan

- Date: October 3
- Game time: 7:00 p.m. EDT
- Game weather: Cloudy and wet, 53 °F (12 °C)
- Game attendance: 11,299
- Referee: Jon Leslie
- Box score, Recap

Game information
First quarter
- GV – Blake Smolen 10-yard run (Justin Trumble kick), 13:47. Lakers 7–0. Drive: 3 plays, 66 yards, 1:13.
- GV – Blake Smolen 20-yard run (Justin Trumble kick), 6:50. Lakers 14–0. Drive: 10 plays, 90 yards, 3:39.
- GV – Blake Smolen 13-yard run (Justin Trumble kick), 2:56. Lakers 21–0. Drive: 7 plays, 73 yards, 2:56.
- GV – Blake Smolen 71-yard pass from Brad Iciek (Justin Trumble kick), 0:25. Lakers 28–0. Drive: 1 play, 71 yards, 0:15.

Second quarter

- GV – Mike Koster 15-yard pass from Brad Iciek (kick failed), 9:18. Lakers 34–0. Drive: 4 plays, 30 yards, 1:42.
- TU – Greg Raspberry 13-yard pass from Nate Scully (Boris Bede kick), 6:29. Lakers 34–7. Drive: 7 plays, 80 yards, 2:49.
- GV – Greg Gay 5-yard run (Justin Trumble kick), 4:52. Lakers 41–7. Drive: 3 plays, 53 yards, 1:37.

Third quarter

- GV – Justin Sherrod 55-yard run (kick blocked), 11:27. Lakers 47–7. Drive: 4 plays, 79 yards, 1:49.
- TU – Brenton Williams 6-yard pass from Nate Scully (Boris Bede kick), 9:39. Lakers 47–14. Drive: 2 plays, 9 yards, 0:44.
- TU – David Singleton 6-yard pass from Nate Scully (Boris Bede kick), 5:02. Lakers 47–21. Drive: 7 plays, 49 yards, 3:13.

Fourth quarter

- No scoring plays

Statistics	TU	GV
First downs	12	26
Total yards	181	596
Rushing yards	44	346
Passing yards	137	250
Turnovers	1	2
Time of possession	26:53	33:07

Team	Category	Player	Statistics
Tiffin	Passing	Nate Scully	15/25, 107 yards, 3 TD, INT
Tiffin	Rushing	Alvin McKnight	8 rushes, 47 yards
Tiffin	Receiving	Greg Raspberry	6 receptions, 51 yards, TD
Grand Valley State	Passing	Brad Iciek	9/15, 231 yards, 2 TD
Grand Valley State	Rushing	Justin Sherrod	19 rushes, 191 yards, TD
Grand Valley State	Receiving	Blake Smolen	2 receptions, 90 yards, TD

=== At Hillsdale ===
No. 1 Grand Valley State Lakers at Hillsdale Chargers – Game summary

Quarter	1	2	3	4	Total
No. 1 Lakers	9	6	6	3	24
Chargers	0	17	3	7	27

at Muddy Waters Stadium, Hillsdale, Michigan

- Date: October 10
- Game time: 2:30 p.m. EDT
- Game weather: Mostly sunny, 51 °F (11 °C)
- Game attendance: 3,116
- Referee: Chris LaMange
- Box score, Recap

Game information
First quarter
- GV – Mike Koster 8-yard pass from Brad Iciek (kick failed), 8:29. Lakers 6–0. Drive: 11 plays, 67 yards, 6:31.
- GV – Justin Trumble 21-yard field goal, 0:25. Lakers 9–0. Drive: 12 plays, 94 yards, 5:25.

Second quarter

- HC – Troy Weatherhead 5-yard run (Mark Petro kick), 12:28. Lakers 9–7. Drive: 8 plays, 79 yards, 2:52.
- HC – Mark Petro 45-yard field goal, 6:30. Chargers 10–9. Drive: 7 plays, 23 yards, 2:53.
- HC – Vinnie Panizzi 10-yard run (Mark Petro kick), 4:19. Chargers 17–9. Drive: 4 plays, 29 yards, 2:05.
- GV – James Berezik 1-yard run (pass failed), 0:16. Chargers 17–15. Drive: 8 plays, 56 yards, 3:55.

Third quarter

- HC – Marc Petro 27-yard field goal, 4:47. Chargers 20–15. Drive: 12 plays, 87 yards, 4:29.
- GV – Blake Smolen 28-yard pass from Brad Iciek (pass failed), 1:56. Lakers 21–20. Drive: 7 plays, 71 yards, 2:44.

Fourth quarter

- GV – Justin Trumble 30-yard field goal, 5:27. Lakers 24–20. Drive: 7 plays, 29 yards, 4:16.
- HC – Billy Kanitz 1-yard run (Mark Petro kick), 0:36. Chargers 27–24. Drive: 11 plays, 67 yards, 4:43.

Statistics	GV	HC
First downs	23	19
Total yards	462	324
Rushing yards	201	58
Passing yards	261	266
Turnovers	1	2
Time of possession	34:28	25:32

Team	Category	Player	Statistics
Grand Valley State	Passing	Brad Iciek	22/29, 261 yards, 2 TD
Grand Valley State	Rushing	James Berezik	13 rushes, 93 yards, TD
Grand Valley State	Receiving	Blake Smolen	8 receptions, 125 yards, TD
Hillsdale	Passing	Troy Weatherhead	21/31, 265 yards, 2 INT
Hillsdale	Rushing	Vinnie Panizzi	17 rushes, 60 yards, TD
Hillsdale	Receiving	A. J. Kegg	7 receptions, 100 yards

=== No. 18 Findlay ===
No. 18 Findlay Oilers at No. 8 Grand Valley State Lakers – Game summary

Quarter	1	2	3	4	Total
No. 18 Oilers	0	7	0	6	13
No. 8 Lakers	7	17	14	0	38

at Lubbers Stadium, Allendale, Michigan

- Date: October 17
- Game time: 7:00 p.m. EDT
- Game weather: Cloudy and cool, 43 °F (6 °C)
- Game attendance: 11,428
- Referee: Mike McCann
- Box score, Recap

Game information
First quarter
- GV – Blake Smolen 20-yard pass from Brad Iciek (Justin Trumble kick), 6:15. Lakers 7–0. Drive: 11 plays, 75 yards, 5:50.

Second quarter

- GV – Blake Smolen 2-yard run (Justin Trumble kick), 9:07. Lakers 14–0. Drive: 5 plays, 53 yards, 2:28.
- GV – P. T. Gates 1-yard run (Justin Trumble kick), 7:30. Lakers 21–0. Drive: 4 plays, 14 yards, 1:24.
- UF – Mike Chambers 59-yard pass from Andrew Beam (Cameron Stevens kick), 4:39. Lakers 21–7. Drive: 5 plays, 70 yards, 2:51.
- GV – Justin Trumble 44-yard field goal, 0:18. Lakers 24–7. Drive: 9 plays, 33 yards, 4:21.

Third quarter

- GV – Brad Iciek 1-yard run (Justin Trumble kick), 11:57. Lakers 31–7. Drive: 6 plays, 59 yards, 3:03.
- GV – Brad Iciek 1-yard run (Justin Trumble kick), 0:36. Lakers 38–7. Drive: 5 plays, 56 yards, 2:32.

Fourth quarter

- UF – Melvin Jackson 4-yard run (kick failed), 11:56. Lakers 38–13. Drive: 10 plays, 68 yards, 3:40.

Statistics	UF	GV
First downs	13	23
Total yards	250	480
Rushing yards	63	266
Passing yards	187	214
Turnovers	2	0
Time of possession	21:41	38:19

Team	Category	Player	Statistics
Findlay	Passing	Andrew Beam	17/23, 187 yards, TD, INT
Findlay	Rushing	Montgomery Williams	6 rushes, 27 yards
Findlay	Receiving	Mike Chambers	8 receptions, 107 yards, TD
Grand Valley State	Passing	Brad Iciek	17/22, 214 yards, TD
Grand Valley State	Rushing	James Berezik	17 rushes, 104 yards
Grand Valley State	Receiving	Blake Smolen	8 receptions, 98 yards, TD

=== At Ashland ===
No. 6 Grand Valley State Lakers at Ashland Eagles – Game summary

Quarter	1	2	3	4	Total
No. 6 Lakers	10	7	10	7	34
Eagles	0	0	0	7	7

at Jack Miller Stadium, Ashland, Ohio

- Date: October 24
- Game time: 1:00 p.m. EDT
- Game weather: Overcast, 40 °F (4 °C)
- Game attendance: 3,491
- Referee: Jeff Servinski
- Box score, Recap

Game information
First quarter
- GV – Justin Trumble 22-yard field goal, 10:51. Lakers 3–0. Drive: 10 plays, 30 yards, 3:21.
- GV – Greg Gay 25-yard pass from Brad Iciek (Justin Trumble kick), 3:18. Lakers 10–0. Drive: 8 plays, 64 yards, 3:43.

Second quarter

- GV – Carlos Clark 10-yard pass from Brad Iciek (Justin Trumble kick), 9:15. Lakers 17–0. Drive: 13 plays, 73 yards, 7:19.

Third quarter

- GV – Blake Smolen 54-yard pass from Brad Iciek (Justin Trumble kick), 13:21. Lakers 24–0. Drive: 3 plays, 59 yards, 1:30.
- GV – Justin Trumble 37-yard field goal, 8:38. Lakers 27–0. Drive: 5 plays, 30 yards, 2:32.

Fourth quarter

- GV – P. T. Gates 10-yard run (Justin Trumble kick), 9:05. Lakers 34–0. Drive: 9 plays, 55 yards, 5:07.
- AU – D'Marris McCoy 13-yard run (Greg Berkshire kick), 4:54. Lakers 34–7. Drive: 8 plays, 71 yards, 4:06.

Statistics	GV	AU
First downs	19	10
Total yards	365	226
Rushing yards	219	177
Passing yards	146	49
Turnovers	0	1
Time of possession	36:37	23:23

Team	Category	Player	Statistics
Grand Valley State	Passing	Brad Iciek	11/20, 146 yards, 3 TD
Grand Valley State	Rushing	P. T. Gates	10 rushes, 95 yards, TD
Grand Valley State	Receiving	Blake Smolen	2 receptions, 62 yards, TD
Ashland	Passing	Billy Cundiff	9/13, 49 yards
Ashland	Rushing	Dawon Harvey	15 rushes, 109 yards
Ashland	Receiving	Christian Livingston	2 receptions, 18 yards

=== Northern Michigan ===
Northern Michigan Wildcats at No. 5 Grand Valley State Lakers – Game summary

Quarter	1	2	3	4	Total
Wildcats	0	6	0	13	19
No. 5 Lakers	17	5	0	9	31

at Lubbers Stadium, Allendale, Michigan

- Date: October 31
- Game time: 7:00 p.m. EDT
- Game weather: Windy and overcast, 42 °F (6 °C)
- Game attendance: 6,633
- Referee: Jake Kemp
- Box score, Recap

Statistics	NM	GV
First downs		
Total yards		
Rushing yards		
Passing yards		
Turnovers		
Time of possession		

Team	Category	Player	Statistics
Northern Michigan	Passing		
Northern Michigan	Rushing		
Northern Michigan	Receiving		
Grand Valley State	Passing		
Grand Valley State	Rushing		
Grand Valley State	Receiving		

=== Wayne State (MI) ===
Wayne State Warriors at No. 5 Grand Valley State Lakers – Game summary

Quarter	1	2	3	4	Total
Warriors	0	7	0	21	28
No. 5 Lakers	17	14	7	21	59

at Lubbers Stadium, Allendale, Michigan

- Date: November 7
- Game time: 1:00 p.m. EST
- Game weather: Sunny and windy, 57 °F (14 °C)
- Game attendance: 8,397
- Referee: Mike McCann
- Box score, Recap

Statistics	WS	GV
First downs		
Total yards		
Rushing yards		
Passing yards		
Turnovers		
Time of possession		

Team	Category	Player	Statistics
Wayne State	Passing		
Wayne State	Rushing		
Wayne State	Receiving		
Grand Valley State	Passing		
Grand Valley State	Rushing		
Grand Valley State	Receiving		

=== No. 15 Hillsdale (NCAA Division II Second Round) ===
NCAA Division II Second Round
No. 15 Hillsdale Chargers at No. 3 Grand Valley State Lakers – Game summary

Quarter	1	2	3	4	Total
No. 15 Chargers	0	0	13	14	27
No. 3 Lakers	10	27	7	0	44

at Lubbers Stadium, Allendale, Michigan

- Date: November 21
- Game time: 1:00 p.m. EST
- Game weather: Partly cloudy, 51 °F (11 °C)
- Game attendance: 8,229
- Referee: Mike McCann
- Box score, Recap

Statistics	HC	GV
First downs		
Total yards		
Rushing yards		
Passing yards		
Turnovers		
Time of possession		

Team	Category	Player	Statistics
Hillsdale	Passing		
Hillsdale	Rushing		
Hillsdale	Receiving		
Grand Valley State	Passing		
Grand Valley State	Rushing		
Grand Valley State	Receiving		

=== At No. 4 Minnesota Duluth (NCAA Division II Quarterfinals) ===
NCAA Division II Quarterfinals
No. 3 Grand Valley State Lakers at No. 4 Minnesota Duluth Bulldogs – Game summary

Quarter	1	2	3	4	Total
No. 3 Lakers	14	3	7	0	24
No. 4 Bulldogs	10	0	0	0	10

at Malosky Stadium, Duluth, Minnesota

- Date: November 28
- Game time: 1:00 p.m. EST/12:00 p.m. CST
- Game weather: Sunny, 37 °F (3 °C)
- Game attendance: 4,211
- Referee: Box score, Recap

Statistics	GV	UMD
First downs		
Total yards		
Rushing yards		
Passing yards		
Turnovers		
Time of possession		

Team	Category	Player	Statistics
Grand Valley State	Passing		
Grand Valley State	Rushing		
Grand Valley State	Receiving		
Minnesota Duluth	Passing		
Minnesota Duluth	Rushing		
Minnesota Duluth	Receiving		

=== No. 10 Carson–Newman (NCAA Division II Semifinals) ===
NCAA Division II Semifinals
No. 10 Carson–Newman Eagles at No. 3 Grand Valley State Lakers – Game summary

Quarter	1	2	3	4	Total
No. 10 Eagles	7	7	6	7	27
No. 3 Lakers	17	10	7	7	41

at Lubbers Stadium, Allendale, Michigan

- Date: December 5
- Game time: 3:30 p.m. EST
- Game weather: Cold and snowy, 25 °F (−4 °C)
- Game attendance: 7,247
- Referee: Fred Brown
- Box score, Recap

Statistics	CN	GV
First downs		
Total yards		
Rushing yards		
Passing yards		
Turnovers		
Time of possession		

Team	Category	Player	Statistics
Carson–Newman	Passing		
Carson–Newman	Rushing		
Carson–Newman	Receiving		
Grand Valley State	Passing		
Grand Valley State	Rushing		
Grand Valley State	Receiving		

=== Vs. No. 3 Northwest Missouri State (NCAA Division II Championship Game) ===
2009 NCAA Division II Championship Game
No. 2 Northwest Missouri State Bearcats vs. No. 3 Grand Valley State Lakers – Game summary

Quarter	1	2	3	4	Total
No. 2 Bearcats	7	14	2	7	30
No. 3 Lakers	0	0	13	10	23

at Braly Municipal Stadium, Florence, Alabama

- Date: December 12
- Game time: 1:00 p.m. EST/12:00 p.m. CST
- Game weather: Cloudy, 40 °F (4 °C)
- Game attendance: 6,211
- Referee: Kenny Johnson
- Box score, Recap

Game information
First quarter
- NW – LaRon Council 14-yard run (Todd Adolf kick), 7:59. Bearcats 7–0. Drive: 6 plays, 76 yards, 1:53.

Second quarter

- NW – Blake Bolles 4-yard run (Todd Adolf kick), 12:51. Bearcats 14–0. Drive: 16 plays, 97 yards, 6:21.
- NW – LaRon Council 17-yard run (Todd Adolf kick), 12:11. Bearcats 21–0. Drive: 1 play, 17 yards, 0:05.

Third quarter

- GV – Andrew Lorman 8-yard pass from Brad Iciek (kick blocked), 11:22. Bearcats 21–6. Drive: 4 plays, 48 yards, 2:20.
- NW – Ryan Jones 98-yard PAT return, 11:22. Bearcats 23–6.
- GV – Ryan Bass 33-yard pass from Brad Iciek (Jay Jandasek kick), 6:26. Bearcats 23–13. Drive: 4 plays, 50 yards, 1:35.

Third quarter

- GV – Blake Smolen 2-yard run (Jay Jandasek kick), 12:26. Bearcats 23–20. Drive: 11 plays, 71 yards, 7:20.
- NW – Jake Soy 26-yard pass from Blake Bolles (Todd Adolf kick), 10:00. Bearcats 30–20. Drive: 4 plays, 32 yards, 2:18.
- GV – Jay Jandasek 21-yard field goal, 4:26. Bearcats 30–23. Drive: 12 plays, 70 yards, 5:34.

Statistics	NW	GV
First downs	20	22
Total yards	366	381
Rushing yards	168	91
Passing yards	198	290
Turnovers	3	1
Time of possession	22:33	37:27

Team	Category	Player	Statistics
Northwest Missouri State	Passing	Blake Bolles	15/23, 198 yards, TD, INT
Northwest Missouri State	Rushing	LaRon Council	22 rushes, 172 yards, 2 TD
Northwest Missouri State	Receiving	Jake Soy	9 receptions, 118 yards, TD
Grand Valley State	Passing	Brad Iciek	28/49, 290 yards, 2 TD, INT
Grand Valley State	Rushing	Blake Smolen	7 rushes, 45 yards, TD
Grand Valley State	Receiving	Ryan Bass	8 receptions, 111 yards, TD

== Personnel ==
2009 Grand Valley State Lakers football team roster
Players
Coaches
Offense

Pos.	#	Name	Class
RB	3	P. T. Gates	Sr
TE	5	Andrew Lorman	So
QB	7	Marquel Neasman	Jr
WR	8	Greg Gay	So
TE	9	Tony Carreri	Jr
WR	11	Blake Smolen	Sr
QB	12	Heath Parling	Fr
QB	13	Brad Iciek	Sr
WR	16	David Fox	So
WR	17	Ryan Bass	Jr
WR	18	Jahan Jones	Sr
WR	19	Justin Sherrod	So
RB	21	James Berezik	Jr
RB	31	Erik Thompson	Fr
RB	41	Hersey Jackson	Fr
RB	46	Billy Seiler	Fr
OL	51	Tim Lelito	Fr
OL	54	Mac Parker	Fr
OL	55	Cameron Bradford	Jr
OL	56	Matt Armstrong	Fr
OL	57	James Hardy	Jr
OL	62	Mark Morrison	So
OL	63	Dominic Cundari	Fr
OL	64	Austin Green	Fr
OL	65	Derrell Haygood	Fr
OL	66	Andrew Biedenbender	Fr
OL	67	Jake Carra	Fr
OL	69	Frazer Burton	So
OL	70	John Godush	Jr
OL	71	Max Larson	Fr
OL	73	Joey Teague	Jr
OL	74	Colin Williams	So
OL	75	Eric LaBuhn	Fr
OL	76	Tory Buter	Jr
OL	77	Nick McDonald	Sr
OL	78	Alex Ahee	So
OL	79	Darris Sawtelle	Fr
WR	80	John Orlando	Fr
WR	81	Cameron Bradford	Sr
TE	82	Will Napier	Jr
TE	83	Ian Evans	So
WR	84	Carlos Clark	Jr
WR	85	Israel Woolfork	Fr
WR	86	Mike Koster	Jr
TE	87	Tyler Moran	Fr
WR	88	Darryl Pitts	Fr
WR	89	Tony Stramaglia	Fr
TE	91	Ed Vushaj	Fr
WR	92	Derrick Smith	Fr
QB		Tyler Copacia	Fr
WR		Brandan Green	Fr
QB		Isiah Grimes	Fr
WR		Andrew Longo	Fr
RB		Anthony Mullins	Fr
QB		Kyle Partlo	Fr
TE		Ryan Ploetz	Fr
WR		Wade Stahl	Fr

Defense

Pos.	#	Name	Class
CB	1	Enrique Shaw	So
CB	2	Robert Carlistle	Sr
LB	4	Jordan Munson	Sr
DL	6	Andre Thomas	So
SS	10	Jacob McGuckin	Sr
DL	14	Blair Hollis	So
CB	15	Chris Howard	Fr
LB	20	Brad Howard	So
CB	22	Myron Puryear	Fr
DL	23	Danny Richard	Jr
CB	24	Dominique Darden	So
DB	25	Gary Fant	Jr
DB	26	Gary Anderson	Sr
FS	27	Matt Bakker	Jr
SS	28	Jarrod Cox	Fr
DB	29	Reggie Williams	Fr
FS	30	Zach Breen	So
CB	32	Vince Beachem	Fr
FS	33	Deon Reed	Fr
DB	34	Chad O'Shell	Fr
LB	35	James Wojciechowski	Sr
DB	37	Michael Hatcher	Fr
LB	38	Matt Flutur	Jr
CB	39	Michael Ratay	Fr
DB	42	Mike Cuddeback	Fr
LB	43	Justin Victor	Jr
LB	44	Ricky Shorkey	Fr
LB	45	Luther Ware	Fr
DL	47	Kevin Rapes	Fr
DL	49	Nick Lawrence	Jr
DL	50	Kenny McDaniel	Fr
DL	53	Charles Martin	Fr
DE	58	Ryan Pettis	Fr
DL	59	Ryan Wheat	So
DL	60	Scott Kimball	Fr
LB	61	Hunter Lewis	Fr
DL	72	Nick Duronio	Fr
DL	90	Bryan Thomas	Sr
DL	93	Alex Gilde	Sr
DE	94	Lucas Kozuch	Fr
DB	95	Derek Beemer	Fr
DL	96	Ricky Thomas	Fr
DL	97	Steve Gawronski	Jr
DE	98	Denzel Rodgers	Fr
CB		Elan Banks	Fr
DB		Brogan Bibler	Fr
DB		Mark Bland	Fr
DL		Andrew Doetsch	Fr
DB		DeMarco Donaldson	Fr
LB		Dave Fortin	Fr
DB		Zach Galloway	Fr
DB		Brent Geers	Fr
DB		Charles Hill	Fr
DB		Jordan Kaufman	Fr
DB		Suave Lavallis	Fr
DB		Gerrit Rauch	Fr
LB		Albert Saleh	Fr
LB		Wyatt Stahl	Fr
DB		Lavelle Walker	Fr
DB		Donavan Wilson	Fr

Special teams

Pos.	#	Name	Class
K	40	Ryan Stokes	Fr
P	48	Justin Trumble	Sr
LS	52	Kurt Schnittger	So
K, P	68	Mike Hendrix	So
P	69	Michael Wezner	Fr
P, K	99	Jay Jandasek	So
P		Tom Greenwood	Fr

Head coach

- Chuck Martin

Coordinators/assistant coaches

- Jack Ginn
  Associate head coach/wide receivers
- Eric Koehler
  Offensive coordinator/quarterbacks
- Matt Mitchell
  Defensive coordinator/linebackers/safeties
- Eddie Brown
  Cornerbacks
- Matt Yoches
  Defensive line
- George Barnett
  Offensive line

Legend

- (C) Team captain
- (S) Suspended
- (I) Ineligible
- Injured
- Redshirt

Roster
Last update: September 27, 2024
