= 2009 Abilene Christian Wildcats football team =

American college football season

2009 Abilene Christian Wildcats football

NCAA Division II Second Round, L 10–35 vs. Northwest Missouri State
- Conference: Lone Star Conference
- South Division

Ranking
- AFCA: No. 13
- Record: 9–4 (6–3 LSC)
- Head coach: Chris Thomsen (5th season)
- Offensive coordinator: Ken Collums (5th season)
- Offensive scheme: Spread
- Defensive coordinator: Jason Johns (4th season)
- Base defense: 3–4
- Home stadium: Shotwell Stadium

2009 Lone Star Conference football standings
	Conf.			Overall
Team	W		L	W		L
Overall*
No. 10 Tarleton State +^	7	–	2	10	–	3
No. 14 Midwestern St. +^	7	–	2	9	–	3
No. 16 Texas A&M–Kingsville +^	7	–	2	9	–	3
No. 13 Abilene Christian ^	6	–	3	9	–	4
West Texas A&M #	6	–	3	7	–	5
SE Oklahoma State	5	–	4	7	–	4
Angelo State	5	–	4	6	–	5
Texas A&M–Commerce	5	–	4	5	–	5
Central Oklahoma	4	–	5	4	–	7
Eastern New Mexico †	2	–	7	3	–	8
Northeastern State	2	–	7	2	–	9
SW Oklahoma State	1	–	8	1	–	10
East Central	0	–	9	0	–	11
North
Texas A&M–Commerce x	5	–	0	5	–	5
SE Oklahoma State	4	–	1	7	–	4
Central Oklahoma	3	–	2	4	–	7
Northeastern State	2	–	3	2	–	9
SW Oklahoma State	1	–	4	1	–	10
East Central	0	–	5	0	–	11
South
No. 10 Tarleton State x+^	4	–	2	10	–	3
No. 14 Midwestern St. x+^	4	–	2	9	–	3
No. 16 Texas A&M–Kingsville x+^	4	–	2	9	–	3
West Texas A&M # x	4	–	2	7	–	5
No. 13 Abilene Christian ^	3	–	3	9	–	4
Angelo State	2	–	4	6	–	5
Eastern New Mexico †	0	–	6	3	–	8
+ – Conference co-champions; ^ – NCAA Division II playoff participant; * – The LSC counted separate overall and division standings. # – Kanza Bowl participant † – Eastern New Mexico vacated all three wins; Rankings from AFCA Poll

The 2009 Abilene Christian Wildcats football team was an American football team that represented Abilene Christian University (ACU) as a member of the South Division of the Lone Star Conference (LSC) during the 2009 NCAA Division II football season. In their fifth season under head coach Chris Thomsen, the Wildcats compiled an overall record of 9–3 record with a mark of 6–3 in conference play, placing fourth in the LSC's South Division. Abilene Christian advanced to the NCAA Division II Football Championship playoffs, where the Wildcats defeated Midwestern State, 24–21, in the first round, before losing to Northwest Missouri State in the second round, 35–10. The team played its home games at Shotwell Stadium in Abilene, Texas.

== Schedule ==
Date	Time	Opponent	Rank	Site	Result	Attendance
August 27	7:00 p.m.	No. 2 Northwest Missouri State*	No. 5	Shotwell Stadium; Abilene, TX	W 19–14	11,322
September 5	6:00 p.m.	Fort Lewis*	No. 3	Shotwell Stadium; Abilene, TX	W 58–10	7,124
September 12	5:00 p.m.	vs. Texas A&M–Commerce	No. 2	Cotton Bowl; Dallas, TX	W 20–14	7,200
September 19	6:00 p.m.	at Southeastern Oklahoma State	No. 2	Shotwell Stadium; Abilene, TX	W 33–14	7,253
September 26	6:00 p.m.	Eastern New Mexico	No. 2	Shotwell Stadium; Abilene, TX	W 44–33	8,542
October 3	2:00 p.m.	at East Central	No. 2	Norris Field; Ada, OK	W 43–6	3,050
October 10	6:00 p.m.	at No. 23 Angelo State	No. 2	San Angelo Stadium; San Angelo, TX	W 38–14	10,250
October 17	2:00 p.m.	West Texas A&M	No. 1	Shotwell Stadium; Abilene, TX	L 21–32	12,875
October 24	6:00 p.m.	at No. 11 Tarleton State	No. 9	Memorial Stadium; Stephenville, TX	L 6–13	7,326
October 31	2:00 p.m.	No. 9 Texas A&M–Kingsville	No. 15	Shotwell Stadium; Abilene, TX	W 47–35	7,337
November 7	1:00 p.m.	at No. 9 Midwestern State	No. 12	Memorial Stadium; Wichita Falls, TX	L 13–15	8,275
November 14	12:00 p.m.	at No. 7 Midwestern State*	No. 18	Memorial Stadium; Wichita Falls, TX (NCAA Division II First Round)	W 24–21	9,265
November 21	12:00 p.m.	at No. 2 Northwest Missouri State*	No. 18	Bearcat Stadium; Maryville, MO (NCAA Division II Second Round)	L 10–35	5,893
*Non-conference game; Rankings from AFCA Poll released prior to the game; All times are in Central time
