= 2009 NCAA Division II football rankings =

- Season: 2009
- Postseason: Single-elimination
- Preseason No. 1: Grand Valley State
- National champions: NW Missouri State
- Conference with most teams in final AFCA poll: LSC (4)

The 2009 NCAA Division II football rankings are from the American Football Coaches Association (AFCA). This is for the 2009 season.

== Legend ==
	Increase in ranking
	Decrease in ranking
	Not ranked previous week
(#–#)	Win–loss record
(Italics)	Number of first place votes
т	Tied with team above or below also with this symbol

== American Football Coaches Association poll ==
	Preseason	Week 1 Sept 1	Week 2 Sept 8	Week 3 Sept 15	Week 4 Sept 22	Week 5 Sept 29	Week 6 Oct 6	Week 7 Oct 13	Week 8 Oct 20	Week 9 Oct 27	Week 10 Nov 3	Week 11 Nov 10	Week 12 Postseason	
1.	Grand Valley State (12)	Grand Valley State (1–0) (21)	Grand Valley State (2–0) (25)	Grand Valley State (3–0) (25)	Grand Valley State (4–0) (24)	Grand Valley State (5–0) (24)	Grand Valley State (6–0) (24)	Abilene Christian (7–0) (23)	North Alabama (8–0) (25)	North Alabama (9–0) (25)	North Alabama (10–0) (25)	Central Washington (11–0) (23)	Northwest Missouri State (14–1) (25)	1.
2.	Northwest Missouri State (4)	Minnesota–Duluth (1–0) (8)	Abilene Christian (2–0)	Abilene Christian (3–0)	Abilene Christian (4–0)	Abilene Christian (5–0)	Abilene Christian (6–0)	North Alabama (7–0) (2)	Central Washington (8–0)	Central Washington (9–0)	Central Washington (10–0)	Northwest Missouri State (10–1) (1)	Grand Valley State (13–2)	2.
3.	Minnesota–Duluth (8)	Abilene Christian (1–0) (1)	North Alabama (2–0)	North Alabama (3–0)	North Alabama (4–0) (1)	North Alabama (5–0) (1)	North Alabama (6–0) (1)	Central Washington (7–0)	Bloomsburg (8–0)	Northwest Missouri State (8–1)	Northwest Missouri State (9–1)	Grand Valley State (10–1)	Central Washington (12–1)	3.
4.	Delta State	North Alabama (1–0)	Pittsburg State (2–0)	Bloomsburg (3–0)	Bloomsburg (4–0)	Bloomsburg (5–0)	Central Washington (6–0)	Bloomsburg (7–0)	Northwest Missouri State (7–1)	Minnesota State (9–0)	Minnesota State (10–0)	Minnesota–Duluth (10–1)	Carson–Newman (11–3)	4.
5.	Abilene Christian (1)	Pittsburg State (1–0)	Bloomsburg (2–0)	Central Washington (3–0)	Central Washington (4–0)	Central Washington (5–0)	Bloomsburg (5–1)	Northwest Missouri State (6–1)	Minnesota State (8–0)	Grand Valley State (8–1)	Grand Valley State (9–1)	North Alabama (10–1) (1)	Minnesota–Duluth (11–2)	5.
6.	North Alabama	Bloomsburg (1–0)	Central Washington (2–0)	Northwest Missouri State (2–1)	Northwest Missouri State (3–1)	Northwest Missouri State (4–1)	Northwest Missouri State (6–0)	Minnesota State (7–0)	Grand Valley State (7–1)	Minnesota–Duluth (8–1)	Minnesota–Duluth (9–1)	Nebraska–Kearney (10–1)	North Alabama (11–2)	6.
7.	Pittsburg State	Chadron State (1–0)	Northwest Missouri State (1–1)	Minnesota State (3–0)	Minnesota State (4–0)	Minnesota State (5–0)	Minnesota State (5–1)	Texas A&M–Kingsville (7–0)	Minnesota–Duluth (7–1)	Tarleton State (8–1)	Tarleton State (9–1)	Midwestern State (9–2)	California (PA) (11–4)	7.
8.	California (PA)	Northwest Missouri State (0–1) (4)	Minnesota State (2–0)	Minnesota–Duluth (2–1)	Minnesota–Duluth (3–1)	Minnesota–Duluth (4–1)	Minnesota–Duluth (6–0)	Grand Valley State (6–1)	Albany State (7–0)	Nebraska–Kearney (8–1)	Nebraska–Kearney (9–1)	Minnesota State (10–1)	Nebraska–Kearney (11–2)	8.
9.	Carson–Newman	Central Washington (1–0)	Minnesota–Duluth (1–1)	Delta State (1–1)	Delta State (2–1)	Texas A&M–Kingsville (5–0)	Texas A&M–Kingsville (5–0)	Minnesota–Duluth (6–1)	Abilene Christian (7–1)	Texas A&M–Kingsville (8–1)	Midwestern State (8–2)	West Liberty State (10–1)	West Liberty State (11–2)	9.
10.	Chadron State	Minnesota State (1–0)	Delta State (0–1)	Texas A&M–Kingsville (3–0)	Texas A&M–Kingsville (4–0)	Albany State (4–0)	Albany State (6–0)	Albany State (6–0)	Charleston (8–0)	Bloomsburg (8–1)	UNC Pembroke (8–1)	Carson–Newman (9–2)	Tarleton State (10–3)	10.
11.	West Texas A&M	Delta State (0–1)	Texas A&M–Kingsville (2–0)	Pittsburg State (2–1)	Central Missouri (4–0)	Tarleton State (5–0)	Charleston (5–1)	Charleston (7–0)	Tarleton State (7–1)	UNC Pembroke (7–1)	West Liberty State (9–1)	UNC Pembroke (9–1)	Hillsdale (10–3)	11.
12.	Valdosta State	Tuskegee (1–0)	Albany State (2–0)	Central Missouri (3–0)	Albany State (3–0)	Missouri Western State (5–0)	Washburn (5–1)	Edinboro (6–1)	Missouri Western State (7–1)	West Liberty State (8–1)	Abilene Christian (8–2)	Tarleton State (9–2)	Minnesota State (10–2)	12.
13.	Bloomsburg	West Texas A&M (0–1)	Central Missouri (2–0)	Albany State (3–0)	Catawba (3–0)	Tuskegee (4–1)	Edinboro (5–1)	Tarleton State (6–1)	Nebraska–Kearney (7–1)	Midwestern State (7–2)	Albany State (8–1)	Texas A&M–Kingsville (9–2)	Abilene Christian (9–4)	13.
14.	Central Washington	West Chester (1–0)	Tuskegee (1–1)	Catawba (3–0)	Tarleton State (4–0)	Ouachita Baptist (4–0)	Wayne State (NE) (5–1)	Central Missouri (6–1)	Texas A&M–Kingsville (7–1)	Albany State (7–1)	Carson–Newman (8–2)	Tuskegee (8–2)	Midwestern State (9–3)	14.
15.	Ashland	Edinboro (1–0)	Chadron State (1–1)	Chadron State (2–1)	Ashland (3–1)	Charleston (5–0)	Tarleton State (5–1)	Missouri Western State (6–1)	UNC Pembroke (6–1)	Abilene Christian (7–2)	Tuskegee (7–2)	Hillsdale (9–2)	Shippensburg (9–3)	15.
16.	Central Oklahoma	Albany State (1–0)	Saginaw Valley State (2–0)	Valdosta State (1–1)	Tuskegee (3–1)	Saginaw Valley State (4–1)	Central Missouri (5–1)	Nebraska–Kearney (6–1)	Washburn (6–2)	Tuskegee (6–2)	Central Missouri (8–2)	Saginaw Valley State (9–2)	Texas A&M–Kingsville (9–3)	16.
17.	Minnesota State (Note: In the actual printed polls, Minnesota State was listed as Minnesota State–Mankato)	California (PA) (0–1)	Catawba (2–0)	Tuskegee (2–1)	Midwestern State (4–0)	Washburn (4–1)	Missouri Western State (5–1)	UNC Pembroke (6–1)	Midwestern State (6–2)	Charleston (8–1)	Texas A&M–Kingsville (8–2)	Shippensburg (9–2)	Tuskegee (10–2)	17.
18.	Tuskegee	Texas A&M–Kingsville (1–0)	Valdosta State (0–1)	Ashland (2–1)	Missouri Western State (4–0)	Wayne State (NE) (4–1)	Midwestern State (5–1)	Findlay (6–1)	West Liberty State (7–1)	Carson–Newman (7–2)	California (PA) (8–2)	Abilene Christian (8–3)	Arkansas Tech (9–3)	18.
19.	Albany State	Central Missouri (1–0)	Ashland (1–1)	Tarleton State (3–0)	Saginaw Valley State (3–1)	Edinboro (4–1)	Wayne State (MI) (5–1)	Tuskegee (5–2)	Tuskegee (5–2)	Central Missouri (7–2)	Bloomsburg (8–2)	Charleston (9–2)	Saginaw Valley State (9–3)	19.
20.	West Chester	Valdosta State (0–1)	Winona State (2–0)	Wayne State (NE) (3–0)	Charleston (4–0) (Note: Charleston refers to University of Charleston in West Virginia)	Central Missouri (4–1)	Ouachita Baptist (4–1)	Washburn (5–2)	Carson–Newman (6–2)	California (PA) (7–2)	Hillsdale (8–2)	Albany State (8–2)	UNC Pembroke (9–2)	20.
21.	Edinboro	Glenville State (1–0)	West Chester (1–1)	IUP (3–0)	Ouachita Baptist (3–0)	Catawba (3–1)	Nebraska–Kearney (5–1)	West Liberty State (6–1)	Central Missouri (6–2)	Edinboro (7–2)	Missouri Western State (8–2)	Arkansas Tech (8–2)	West Alabama (8–5)	21.
22.	Glenville State	Carson–Newman (0–1)	Tarleton State (2–0)	Washburn (3–0)	Wayne State (NE) (3–1)	Wayne State (MI) (4–1)	Delta State (3–2)	Midwestern State (5–2)	Wayne State (NE) (6–2)	Hillsdale (7–2)	Saginaw Valley State (8–2)	California (PA) (8–3)	Albany State (8–3)	22.
23.	Tusculum	Ashland (0–1)	Wayne State (NE) (2–0)	Saginaw Valley State (2–1)	Pittsburg State (2–2)	Midwestern State (4–1)	Angelo State (5–1)	Northern Michigan (5–1)	Edinboro (6–2)	Missouri Western State (7–2)	Shippensburg (8–2)	Central Missouri (8–3)	Charleston (9–2)	23.
24.	Fayetteville State	Saginaw Valley State (1–0)	Central Oklahoma (1–1)	Midwestern State (3–0)	Edinboro (3–1)	Hillsdale (4–1)	Tuskegee (4–2)	Wayne State (NE) (5–2)	California (PA) (6–2)	Saginaw Valley State (7–2)	Bentley (8–1)	Washburn (8–3)	Edinboro (9–4)	24.
25.	Central Missouri	Catawba (1–0)	IUP (2–0) (Note: In the actual printed polls, IUP was listed as Indiana (PA))	Augustana (SD) (3–0)	Winona State (3–1)	Delta State (2–2)	UNC Pembroke (5–1) (Note: In the actual printed polls, UNC Pembroke was listed as North Carolina, Pembroke)	Carson–Newman (5–2)	Hillsdale (6–2)	Bentley (8–1)	Charleston (8–2)	Bloomsburg (8–3)	Washburn (8–3)	25.
	Preseason	Week 1 Sept 1	Week 2 Sept 8	Week 3 Sept 15	Week 4 Sept 22	Week 5 Sept 29	Week 6 Oct 6	Week 7 Oct 13	Week 8 Oct 20	Week 9 Oct 27	Week 10 Nov 3	Week 11 Nov 10	Week 12 Postseason	
		Dropped: 16 Central Oklahoma; 23 Tusculum; 24 Fayetteville State	Dropped: 13 West Texas A&M; 15 Edinboro; 17 California (PA); 21 Glenville State; 22 Carson–Newman	Dropped: 20 Winona State; 21 West Chester; 24 Central Oklahoma	Dropped: 15 Chadron State; 16 Valdosta State; 21 IUP; 22 Washburn; 25 Augustana (SD)	Dropped: 15 Ashland; 23 Pittsburg State; 25 Winona State	Dropped: 16 Saginaw Valley State; 21 Catawba; 24 Hillsdale	Dropped: 19 Wayne State (MI); 20 Ouachita Baptist; 22 Delta State; 23 Angelo State	Dropped: 18 Findlay; 23 Northern Michigan	Dropped: 16 Washburn; 22 Wayne State (NE)	Dropped: 21 Edinboro	Dropped: 21 Missouri Western State; 24 Bentley	Dropped: 23 Central Missouri; 25 Bloomsburg	
