= Mel Tjeerdsma =

American football coach (born 1946)

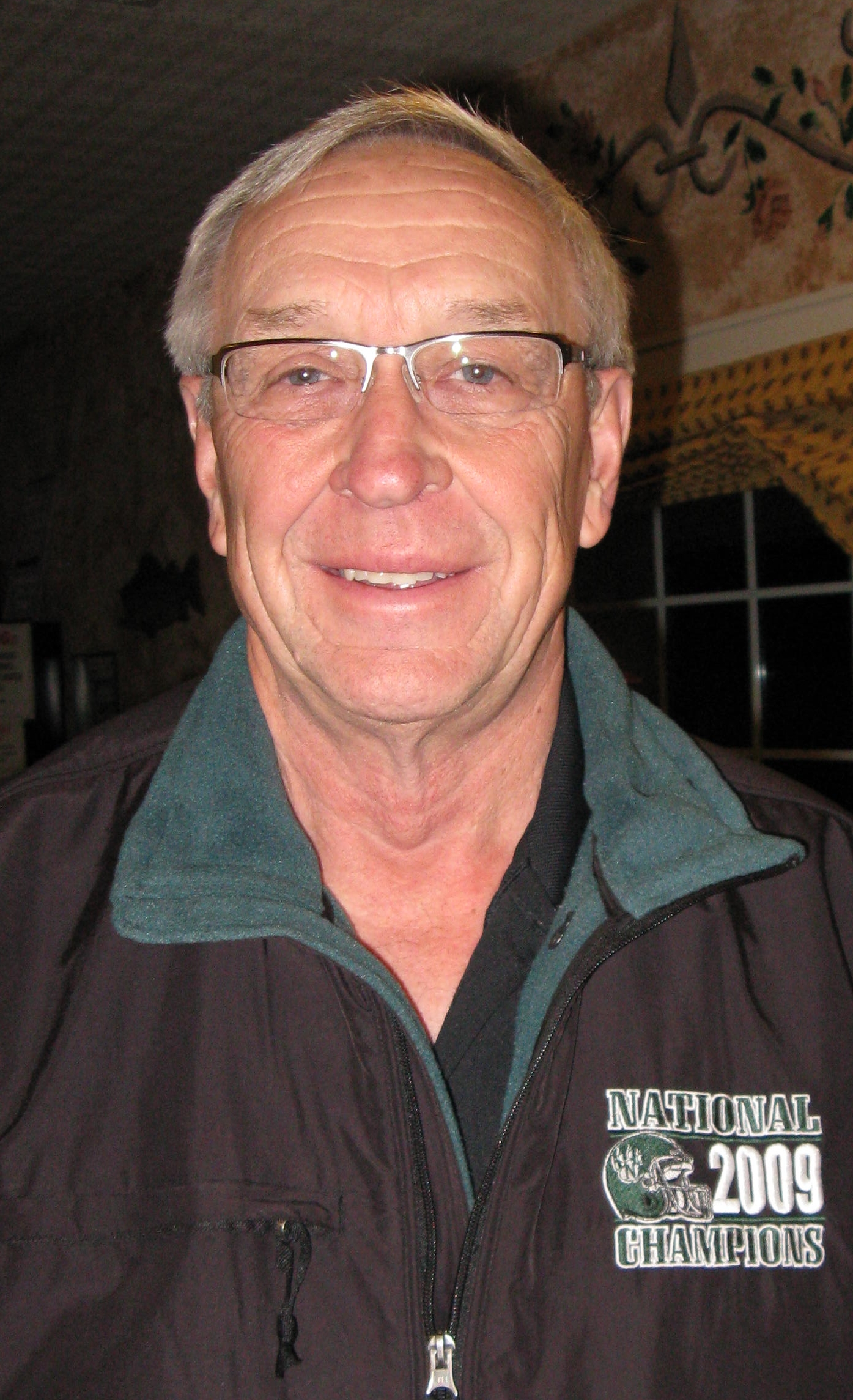

Biographical details
- Born: May 24, 1946 (age 80); Springfield, South Dakota, U.S.
- Education: Southern State College (SD)

Coaching career (HC unless noted)
- 1976–1983: Northwestern (IA) (OC)
- 1984–1993: Austin
- 1994–2010: Northwest Missouri State
- 2011: United States national team

Administrative career (AD unless noted)
- 2013–2018: Northwest Missouri State

Head coaching record
- Overall: 242–82–4
- Tournaments: 0–2 (NAIA D-II playoffs); 32–10 (NCAA D-II playoffs); 4–0 (IFAF World Cup)

Accomplishments and honors

Championships
- 3 NCAA Division II (1998–1999, 2009); 3 TIAA (1984–1985, 1988); 12 MIAA (1996–2000, 2002–2003, 2006–2010); 1 IFAF World Championship (2011)

Awards
- 4× AFCA Division II COY (1997–1998, 2008–2009); Liberty Mutual Division II COY (2009); Amos Alonzo Stagg Award (2022)
- College Football Hall of Fame; Inducted in 2018 (profile)

Mel Tjeerdsma (/ˈtʃɜːrtʃmə/ CHURCH-mə; born May 24, 1946) is a retired American football coach and athletic director at Northwest Missouri State University in Maryville, Missouri. He served as the head coach at Austin College in Sherman, Texas from 1984 to 1993 and at Northwest Missouri State University from 1994 until his retirement after the 2010 season. In his 27 years as a head coach, Tjeerdsma compiled a career college football record of 242–82–4. He led the Northwest Missouri State Bearcats to three NCAA Division II Football Championship titles (1998, 1999, and 2009) and four additional NCAA Division II title games (2005, 2006, 2007, and 2008).

== Early life and education ==
Tjeerdsma was born and grew up on a farm in Springfield, South Dakota. He graduated from Springfield High School in 1964 and attended Southern State College in Springfield where he participated in several sports. Tjeerdsma earned his bachelor's degree in physical education from the college in 1967. He was a teacher and assistant football coach in Akron, Iowa in 1968. He received his master's degree in physical education at Northwestern College in 1977.

== Coaching career ==
Tjeerdsma coached at Sioux Center (Iowa) High School and in 1972 won the very first Class 2A State football championship. He went on to Denison High School in Denison, Iowa, where he guided his team to a 9–0 record in 1975 and a berth in the state playoffs. He earned Northwest Iowa Football Coach of the Year honors in 1972 and was the Northwest Iowa Track and Field Coach of the Year in 1973, 1974 and 1975.

Tjeerdsma was the offensive coordinator at Northwestern College in Orange City, Iowa for eight years. He was also the head track and field coach at Northwestern. The Red Raiders earned four trips to the NAIA Division II Playoffs while Tjeerdsma was there, including a national championship in 1983. His offense twice led the nation in total offense and scoring. His track and field teams won three Tri-State Conference titles and five consecutive NAIA District 15 indoor championships.

Tjeerdsma was the head coach at Austin College in Sherman, Texas from 1984 through 1993. He compiled a 59–39–4 record and was the school's winningest coach. Tjeerdsma guided Austin College to three Texas Intercollegiate Athletic Association championships in 1984, 1985 and 1988 and made two trips to the NAIA Division II playoffs.

=== Northwest Missouri State ===
Before Tjeerdsma's arrival in 1994, Northwest Missouri State University experienced a series of problems. Missouri under Governor John Ashcroft had announced plans to close the school. The state had also balked at converting U.S. Route 71 to Maryville to a four-lane highway, even as it had converted the rest of the highway south of Saint Joseph, Missouri to interstate standards.

The Bearcats went 0–11 in Tjeerdsma's first year in 1994, finishing last in the Mid-America Intercollegiate Athletics Association. In 1996, they made the playoffs for the first time since 1984. In 1998, the Bearcats won the NCAA Division II Football Championship compiling a record of 15–0. It also marked the first time the Bearcats won a national championship in any sport.

In 2005, the Bearcats were a Cinderella team being ranked 22nd at the start of the playoffs, but won four games on the road until reaching the finals where they faced Grand Valley State. Oddly enough, the title game was the first time in the 2005 playoffs that the Bearcats played on the same field for a second time. They beat North Alabama in Florence the week before. Northwest Missouri State led the game until the closing minutes and came within a dropped pass in the end zone in the closing seconds from a victory.

The championships have rocketed Northwest into high visibility. The St. Louis Rams donated their private jet to the team to fly the Bearcats to the championship game in Florence, Alabama. When Tjeerdsma began his run, Northwest could not play some home playoff games to which it was entitled because of poor conditions at Rickenbrode Stadium. The stadium underwent a $5 million renovation including the additions of luxury boxes and a color replay video board. The renovated Rickenbrode Stadium opened in 2002. The stadium was renamed Bearcat Stadium in 2004 to honor the contributions of the many individuals and organizations who worked in the fundraising efforts. On August 23, 2007, the field at Bearcat Stadium was named Mel Tjeerdsma Field in the coach's honor.

In 2006, Tjeerdsma was elected president of the American Football Coaches Association.

== Post-retirement ==
In 2011, he was named head coach of the United States national American football team in the 2011 IFAF World Cup.

In June 2011 he announced that he would join the development team in the Austin College Institutional Advancement Division in the fall of 2011, leading fundraising efforts for athletics enhancement. On March 21, 2013, Tjeerdsma was named the new athletic director at Northwest Missouri State University. Tjeerdsma retired on April 30, 2018.

== Family ==
Tjeerdsma, his wife Carol reside in Maryville, Missouri. They have three grown children that are married.

== Head coaching record ==
Year	Team	Overall	Conference	Standing	Bowl/playoffs
Austin Kangaroos (Texas Intercollegiate Athletic Association) (1984–1993)
1984	Austin	5–4–1	4–1–1	1st	
1985	Austin	7–3	4–2	T–1st	
1986	Austin	6–4	2–4	T–2nd	
1987	Austin	2–5–3	0–4–2	4th	
1988	Austin	9–2	9–1	1st	L NAIA Division II First Round
1989	Austin	6–4			
1990	Austin	8–3	4–2	2nd	L NAIA Division II First Round
1991	Austin	6–4	3–2	T–2nd	
1992	Austin	6–4	2–3	T–3rd	
1993	Austin	4–6	2–3	T–3rd	
Austin:		59–39–4			
Northwest Missouri State Bearcats (Mid-America Intercollegiate Athletics Association) (1994–2010)
1994	Northwest Missouri State	0–11	0–9	10th	
1995	Northwest Missouri State	6–5	6–3	T–2nd	
1996	Northwest Missouri State	11–2	8–1	T–1st	L NCAA Division II Quarterfinal
1997	Northwest Missouri State	12–1	9–0	1st	L NCAA Division II Quarterfinal
1998	Northwest Missouri State	15–0	9–0	1st	W NCAA Division II Championship
1999	Northwest Missouri State	14–1	9–0	1st	W NCAA Division II Championship
2000	Northwest Missouri State	11–1	9–0	1st	L NCAA Division II First Round
2001	Northwest Missouri State	7–4	6–3	T–3rd	
2002	Northwest Missouri State	12–1	9–0	1st	L NCAA Division II Quarterfinal
2003	Northwest Missouri State	8–3	7–2	T–1st	
2004	Northwest Missouri State	11–2	8–1	2nd	L NCAA Division II Quarterfinal
2005	Northwest Missouri State	11–4	6–2	T–2nd	L NCAA Division II Championship
2006	Northwest Missouri State	14–1	9–0	1st	L NCAA Division II Championship
2007	Northwest Missouri State	12–2	9–0	1st	L NCAA Division II Championship
2008	Northwest Missouri State	13–2	9–0	1st	L NCAA Division II Championship
2009	Northwest Missouri State	14–1	9–0	1st	W NCAA Division II Championship
2010	Northwest Missouri State	12–2	9–0	1st	L NCAA Division II Semifinal
Northwest Missouri State:		183–43	131–21		
Total:		242–82–4			
National championship Conference title Conference division title or championship game berth

== See also ==
- List of college football career coaching wins leaders
- List of presidents of the American Football Coaches Association
