= List of Lone Star Conference football standings =

This is a list of yearly Lone Star Conference football standings.

== Lone Star standings ==
1932 Lone Star Conference football standings
	Conf.					Overall
Team	W		L		T	W		L		T
North Texas State $	5	–	0	–	0	8	–	1	–	1
Southwest Texas State	3	–	1	–	0	5	–	3	–	0
Trinity (TX)	2	–	1	–	1	5	–	2	–	1
East Texas State	2	–	2	–	1	3	–	4	–	1
Sam Houston State	1	–	4	–	0	2	–	6	–	1
Stephen F. Austin	0	–	5	–	0	2	–	7	–	0
$ – Conference champion

1933 Lone Star Conference football standings
	Conf.					Overall
Team	W		L		T	W		L		T
East Texas State $	5	–	0	–	0	5	–	2	–	1
Southwest Texas State	3	–	1	–	1	7	–	1	–	1
North Texas State	2	–	2	–	1	3	–	4	–	2
Sam Houston State	1	–	2	–	2	3	–	4	–	2
Trinity (TX)	1	–	3	–	1	2	–	5	–	2
Stephen F. Austin	0	–	4	–	1	0	–	6	–	1
$ – Conference champion

1934 Lone Star Conference football standings
	Conf.					Overall
Team	W		L		T	W		L		T
East Texas State $	4	–	0	–	0	8	–	0	–	0
North Texas State	2	–	2	–	0	5	–	4	–	0
Sam Houston State	2	–	2	–	0	3	–	4	–	2
Stephen F. Austin	1	–	2	–	1	3	–	3	–	2
Southwest Texas State	0	–	3	–	1	2	–	7	–	1
$ – Conference champion

1935 Lone Star Conference football standings
	Conf.					Overall
Team	W		L		T	W		L		T
East Texas State +	3	–	1	–	0	6	–	2	–	1
North Texas State +	3	–	1	–	0	5	–	3	–	1
Stephen F. Austin +	3	–	1	–	0	4	–	5	–	0
Southwest Texas State	1	–	3	–	0	2	–	7	–	0
Sam Houston State	0	–	4	–	0	3	–	6	–	0
+ – Conference co-champions

1936 Lone Star Conference football standings
	Conf.					Overall
Team	W		L		T	W		L		T
North Texas State $	4	–	0	–	0	6	–	2	–	1
East Texas State	3	–	1	–	0	8	–	2	–	0
Stephen F. Austin	2	–	2	–	0	4	–	3	–	1
Southwest Texas State	1	–	3	–	0	3	–	5	–	1
Sam Houston State	0	–	4	–	0	2	–	7	–	0
$ – Conference champion

1937 Lone Star Conference football standings
	Conf.					Overall
Team	W		L		T	W		L		T
East Texas State $	4	–	0	–	0	8	–	2	–	0
North Texas State	2	–	1	–	1	4	–	4	–	2
Southwest Texas State	2	–	2	–	0	6	–	4	–	0
Sam Houston State	1	–	3	–	0	5	–	5	–	0
Stephen F. Austin	0	–	3	–	1	1	–	6	–	1
$ – Conference champion

1938 Lone Star Conference football standings
	Conf.					Overall
Team	W		L		T	W		L		T
East Texas State $	4	–	0	–	0	8	–	1	–	0
Sam Houston State	3	–	1	–	0	8	–	2	–	0
North Texas State	2	–	2	–	0	7	–	4	–	0
Stephen F. Austin	1	–	3	–	0	3	–	5	–	1
Southwest Texas State	0	–	4	–	0	0	–	8	–	0
$ – Conference champion

1939 Lone Star Conference football standings
	Conf.					Overall
Team	W		L		T	W		L		T
North Texas State $	4	–	0	–	0	6	–	1	–	0
Sam Houston State	2	–	1	–	1	6	–	2	–	2
East Texas State	2	–	2	–	0	7	–	3	–	0
Stephen F. Austin	1	–	3	–	0	3	–	4	–	2
Southwest Texas State	0	–	3	–	1	3	–	5	–	2
$ – Conference champion

1940 Lone Star Conference football standings
	Conf.					Overall
Team	W		L		T	W		L		T
North Texas State $	4	–	0	–	0	6	–	3	–	0
Sam Houston State	3	–	1	–	0	8	–	2	–	0
East Texas State	2	–	2	–	0	4	–	4	–	0
Stephen F. Austin	1	–	3	–	0	4	–	5	–	0
Southwest Texas State	0	–	4	–	0	3	–	5	–	1
$ – Conference champion

1941 Lone Star Conference football standings
	Conf.					Overall
Team	W		L		T	W		L		T
North Texas State $	4	–	0	–	0	7	–	1	–	0
Southwest Texas State	3	–	1	–	0	4	–	4	–	0
East Texas State	2	–	2	–	0	6	–	2	–	1
Sam Houston State	1	–	3	–	0	2	–	7	–	1
Stephen F. Austin	0	–	4	–	0	1	–	6	–	1
$ – Conference champion

1942 Lone Star Conference football standings
	Conf.					Overall
Team	W		L		T	W		L		T
East Texas State $	2	–	0	–	1	4	–	3	–	1
Sam Houston State	2	–	1	–	0	5	–	3	–	0
North Texas State	1	–	2	–	0	3	–	5	–	0
Southwest Texas State	0	–	2	–	1	3	–	4	–	1
$ – Conference champion

1946 Lone Star Conference football standings
	Conf.					Overall
Team	W		L		T	W		L		T
North Texas State $	4	–	1	–	0	7	–	3	–	1
Sam Houston State	3	–	1	–	1	6	–	2	–	1
East Texas State	3	–	1	–	1	5	–	2	–	2
Southwest Texas State	3	–	2	–	0	6	–	2	–	2
Houston	1	–	4	–	0	4	–	6	–	0
Stephen F. Austin	0	–	5	–	0	1	–	9	–	0
$ – Conference champion

1947 Lone Star Conference football standings
	Conf.					Overall
Team	W		L		T	W		L		T
North Texas State $	6	–	0	–	0	10	–	2	–	0
East Texas State	4	–	2	–	0	8	–	2	–	0
Southwest Texas State	4	–	2	–	0	5	–	4	–	0
Trinity (TX)	3	–	2	–	1	5	–	3	–	2
Stephen F. Austin	2	–	3	–	1	3	–	6	–	1
Sam Houston State	1	–	5	–	0	3	–	6	–	0
Houston	0	–	6	–	0	3	–	8	–	0
$ – Conference champion

1948 Lone Star Conference football standings
	Conf.					Overall
Team	W		L		T	W		L		T
Southwest Texas State $	6	–	0	–	0	8	–	1	–	0
North Texas State	4	–	2	–	0	6	–	4	–	0
Stephen F. Austin	3	–	2	–	1	7	–	2	–	1
Trinity (TX)	2	–	2	–	2	6	–	2	–	2
Houston	3	–	3	–	0	5	–	6	–	0
East Texas State	1	–	4	–	1	3	–	6	–	1
Sam Houston State	0	–	6	–	0	0	–	9	–	1
$ – Conference champion

1949 Lone Star Conference football standings
	Conf.					Overall
Team	W		L		T	W		L		T
East Texas State $	3	–	0	–	0	5	–	3	–	1
Stephen F. Austin	2	–	1	–	0	7	–	2	–	0
Southwest Texas State	1	–	2	–	0	3	–	6	–	1
Sam Houston State	0	–	3	–	0	3	–	7	–	0
$ – Conference champion

1950 Lone Star Conference football standings
	Conf.					Overall
Team	W		L		T	W		L		T
Sul Ross $	3	–	0	–	1	8	–	2	–	1
Southwest Texas State	2	–	2	–	0	6	–	3	–	0
Stephen F. Austin	2	–	2	–	0	5	–	5	–	0
East Texas State	1	–	2	–	1	4	–	5	–	2
Sam Houston State	1	–	3	–	0	5	–	5	–	0
$ – Conference champion

1951 Lone Star Conference football standings
	Conf.					Overall
Team	W		L		T	W		L		T
East Texas State $	5	–	0	–	0	9	–	2	–	0
Southwest Texas State	2	–	2	–	1	6	–	3	–	1
Sam Houston State	2	–	2	–	1	4	–	4	–	1
Stephen F. Austin	2	–	3	–	0	4	–	4	–	1
Lamar Tech	2	–	3	–	0	4	–	6	–	0
Sul Ross	1	–	4	–	0	3	–	7	–	0
$ – Conference champion

1952 Lone Star Conference football standings
	Conf.					Overall
Team	W		L		T	W		L		T
East Texas State $	5	–	0	–	0	11	–	0	–	0
Southwest Texas State	4	–	1	–	0	7	–	2	–	0
Sam Houston State	2	–	3	–	0	6	–	4	–	0
Sul Ross	2	–	3	–	0	4	–	6	–	0
Lamar Tech	1	–	4	–	0	2	–	7	–	0
Stephen F. Austin	1	–	4	–	0	2	–	7	–	0
$ – Conference champion

1953 Lone Star Conference football standings
	Conf.					Overall
Team	W		L		T	W		L		T
East Texas State $	5	–	0	–	0	10	–	0	–	1
Sam Houston State	4	–	1	–	0	9	–	1	–	0
Southwest Texas State	3	–	2	–	0	5	–	4	–	0
Lamar Tech	2	–	3	–	0	3	–	7	–	0
Sul Ross	1	–	4	–	0	4	–	7	–	0
Stephen F. Austin	0	–	5	–	0	1	–	8	–	0
$ – Conference champion

1954 Lone Star Conference football standings
	Conf.					Overall
Team	W		L		T	W		L		T
Southwest Texas State +	5	–	0	–	1	6	–	3	–	1
East Texas State +	5	–	0	–	1	6	–	3	–	1
Stephen F. Austin	3	–	3	–	0	6	–	3	–	0
Sam Houston State	3	–	3	–	0	6	–	4	–	0
Texas A&I	2	–	4	–	0	6	–	5	–	0
Sul Ross	1	–	5	–	0	4	–	7	–	0
Lamar Tech	1	–	5	–	0	3	–	7	–	0
+ – Conference co-champions

1955 Lone Star Conference football standings
	Conf.					Overall
Team	W		L		T	W		L		T
Sam Houston State +	5	–	1	–	0	6	–	1	–	2
Southwest Texas State +	5	–	1	–	0	6	–	1	–	2
East Texas State +	5	–	1	–	0	5	–	4	–	1
Stephen F. Austin	2	–	4	–	0	5	–	4	–	0
Lamar Tech	2	–	4	–	0	4	–	6	–	0
Texas A&I	2	–	4	–	0	4	–	6	–	0
Sul Ross	0	–	6	–	0	2	–	8	–	0
+ – Conference co-champions

1956 Lone Star Conference football standings
	Conf.					Overall
Team	W		L		T	W		L		T
Sam Houston State $	6	–	0	–	0	10	–	0	–	0
Texas A&I	5	–	1	–	0	7	–	3	–	0
Southwest Texas State	4	–	2	–	0	6	–	3	–	0
Stephen F. Austin	3	–	3	–	0	4	–	6	–	0
Lamar Tech	2	–	4	–	0	4	–	4	–	1
East Texas State	1	–	5	–	0	2	–	8	–	0
Sul Ross	0	–	6	–	0	1	–	9	–	0
$ – Conference champion

1957 Lone Star Conference football standings
	Conf.					Overall
Team	W		L		T	W		L		T
Lamar Tech $	5	–	0	–	2	8	–	0	–	2
East Texas State	6	–	1	–	0	9	–	1	–	0
Stephen F. Austin	5	–	2	–	0	6	–	4	–	0
Sam Houston State	3	–	3	–	1	3	–	5	–	1
Southwest Texas State	3	–	4	–	0	4	–	6	–	0
Texas A&I	2	–	4	–	1	5	–	5	–	1
Howard Payne	2	–	5	–	0	3	–	6	–	0
Sul Ross	0	–	7	–	0	3	–	7	–	0
$ – Conference champion

1958 Lone Star Conference football standings
	Conf.					Overall
Team	W		L		T	W		L		T
No. 5 East Texas State $	6	–	1	–	0	10	–	1	–	0
Lamar Tech	5	–	2	–	0	6	–	2	–	0
Sam Houston State	5	–	2	–	0	7	–	2	–	0
Texas A&I	4	–	3	–	0	7	–	4	–	0
Southwest Texas State	4	–	3	–	0	5	–	5	–	0
Howard Payne	2	–	5	–	0	2	–	7	–	0
Stephen F. Austin	1	–	6	–	0	2	–	7	–	0
Sul Ross	1	–	6	–	0	2	–	8	–	0
$ – Conference champion; Rankings from UPI small college poll

1959 Lone Star Conference football standings
	Conf.					Overall
Team	W		L		T	W		L		T
No. 5 Texas A&I +^	6	–	1	–	0	12	–	1	–	0
No. 4 East Texas State +	6	–	1	–	0	9	–	1	–	0
Lamar Tech	4	–	3	–	0	8	–	3	–	0
Stephen F. Austin	4	–	3	–	0	4	–	6	–	1
Sam Houston State	3	–	4	–	0	5	–	5	–	0
Howard Payne	3	–	4	–	0	3	–	7	–	0
Southwest Texas State	2	–	5	–	0	4	–	6	–	0
Sul Ross	0	–	7	–	0	0	–	9	–	0
+ – Conference co-champions; ^ – NAIA playoff participant; Rankings from NAIA poll

1960 Lone Star Conference football standings
	Conf.					Overall
Team	W		L		T	W		L		T
No. 3 Texas A&I $	6	–	1	–	0	8	–	1	–	1
East Texas State	5	–	2	–	0	6	–	4	–	0
Lamar Tech	5	–	2	–	0	8	–	4	–	0
Howard Payne	4	–	3	–	0	6	–	4	–	0
Sul Ross	4	–	3	–	0	7	–	3	–	0
Sam Houston State	2	–	5	–	0	3	–	6	–	0
Southwest Texas State	1	–	6	–	0	2	–	8	–	0
Stephen F. Austin	1	–	6	–	0	1	–	10	–	0
$ – Conference champion; Rankings from NAIA poll

1961 Lone Star Conference football standings
	Conf.					Overall
Team	W		L		T	W		L		T
Sam Houston State $	7	–	0	–	0	8	–	1	–	0
Texas A&I	5	–	2	–	0	7	–	2	–	0
Lamar Tech	4	–	2	–	1	8	–	2	–	1
Howard Payne	4	–	3	–	0	4	–	5	–	0
East Texas State	3	–	4	–	0	4	–	6	–	0
Southwest Texas State	2	–	4	–	1	4	–	5	–	1
Sul Ross	1	–	6	–	0	3	–	7	–	0
Stephen F. Austin	1	–	6	–	0	1	–	9	–	0
$ – Conference champion

1962 Lone Star Conference football standings
	Conf.					Overall
Team	W		L		T	W		L		T
No. 4 Texas A&I $	6	–	0	–	1	9	–	0	–	1
Southwest Texas State	6	–	1	–	0	8	–	2	–	0
Sam Houston State	4	–	2	–	1	5	–	3	–	1
Lamar Tech	4	–	3	–	0	7	–	3	–	0
East Texas State	3	–	3	–	1	5	–	4	–	1
Sul Ross	2	–	5	–	0	4	–	6	–	0
Stephen F. Austin	1	–	6	–	0	1	–	9	–	0
Howard Payne	0	–	6	–	1	1	–	8	–	1
$ – Conference champion; Rankings from NAIA poll

1963 Lone Star Conference football standings
	Conf.					Overall
Team	W		L		T	W		L		T
No. 7 Southwest Texas State $	6	–	0	–	0	10	–	0	–	0
East Texas State	4	–	2	–	0	7	–	2	–	1
Stephen F. Austin	4	–	2	–	0	7	–	3	–	0
Texas A&I	3	–	3	–	0	5	–	4	–	0
Sam Houston State	2	–	3	–	1	4	–	3	–	1
Howard Payne	1	–	5	–	0	3	–	7	–	0
Sul Ross	0	–	5	–	1	1	–	7	–	1
$ – Conference champion; Rankings from NAIA poll

1964 Lone Star Conference football standings
	Conf.					Overall
Team	W		L		T	W		L		T
No. 2/10 Sam Houston State $^	5	–	1	–	0	9	–	1	–	1
No. 14/NR Sul Ross	4	–	1	–	1	7	–	3	–	1
Southwest Texas State	4	–	2	–	0	7	–	2	–	0
Texas A&I	3	–	2	–	1	7	–	2	–	1
Stephen F. Austin	3	–	3	–	0	4	–	5	–	0
East Texas State	1	–	5	–	0	2	–	7	–	0
Howard Payne	0	–	6	–	0	2	–	8	–	0
$ – Conference champion; ^ – NAIA playoff participant; Rankings from NAIA poll and AP small college poll

1965 Lone Star Conference football standings
	Conf.					Overall
Team	W		L		T	W		L		T
No. 2 Sul Ross $^	6	–	0	–	0	10	–	1	–	0
Southwest Texas State	4	–	2	–	0	8	–	2	–	0
Stephen F. Austin	4	–	2	–	0	6	–	3	–	0
Texas A&I	4	–	2	–	0	6	–	3	–	0
East Texas State	2	–	4	–	0	4	–	5	–	0
Sam Houston State	1	–	4	–	0	4	–	6	–	0
Howard Payne	0	–	6	–	0	2	–	8	–	0
McMurry	0	–	0	–	0	4	–	5	–	1
$ – Conference champion; ^ – NAIA playoff participant; Rankings from NAIA poll

1966 Lone Star Conference football standings
	Conf.					Overall
Team	W		L		T	W		L		T
East Texas State $	4	–	1	–	2	5	–	3	–	2
Southwest Texas State	4	–	2	–	1	7	–	2	–	1
Sam Houston State	4	–	2	–	1	6	–	3	–	1
Sul Ross	3	–	3	–	1	6	–	3	–	1
Stephen F. Austin	3	–	3	–	1	5	–	3	–	1
Howard Payne	3	–	3	–	1	5	–	5	–	1
Texas A&I	3	–	4	–	0	5	–	5	–	0
McMurry	0	–	6	–	1	1	–	8	–	1
$ – Conference champion

1967 Lone Star Conference football standings
	Conf.					Overall
Team	W		L		T	W		L		T
No. 4 Texas A&I $	7	–	0	–	0	9	–	0	–	0
No. 8 Southwest Texas State	6	–	1	–	0	9	–	1	–	0
Howard Payne	4	–	3	–	0	7	–	3	–	0
McMurry	4	–	3	–	0	6	–	4	–	0
East Texas State	3	–	4	–	0	4	–	6	–	0
Stephen F. Austin	3	–	4	–	0	4	–	6	–	0
Sam Houston State	1	–	6	–	0	3	–	6	–	0
Sul Ross	0	–	7	–	0	3	–	7	–	0
$ – Conference champion; Rankings from NAIA poll

1968 Lone Star Conference football standings
	Conf.					Overall
Team	W		L		T	W		L		T
No. 2/6 Texas A&I $^	6	–	1	–	0	10	–	2	–	0
East Texas State	5	–	1	–	1	7	–	2	–	1
McMurry	5	–	2	–	0	8	–	2	–	0
Sam Houston State	3	–	3	–	1	5	–	4	–	1
Southwest Texas State	3	–	4	–	0	5	–	5	–	0
Sul Ross	2	–	4	–	1	5	–	4	–	1
Howard Payne	1	–	5	–	1	2	–	7	–	1
Stephen F. Austin	1	–	6	–	0	3	–	7	–	0
Tarleton State *	0	–	0	–	0	2	–	7	–	0
Angelo State *	0	–	0	–	0	2	–	9	–	0
$ – Conference champion; ^ – NAIA playoff participant * – did not complete for conference title; Rankings from NAIA poll and AP small college poll

1969 Lone Star Conference football standings
	Conf.					Overall
Team	W		L		T	W		L		T
No. 1/11 Texas A&I +^	6	–	1	–	0	11	–	1	–	0
East Texas State +	6	–	1	–	0	7	–	3	–	0
Stephen F. Austin	5	–	2	–	0	7	–	3	–	0
Southwest Texas State	3	–	4	–	0	3	–	6	–	1
Sul Ross	3	–	3	–	1	4	–	5	–	1
Sam Houston State	2	–	4	–	1	3	–	6	–	1
Howard Payne	2	–	5	–	0	4	–	7	–	0
McMurry	1	–	6	–	0	2	–	8	–	0
Angelo State *	0	–	0	–	0	6	–	4	–	0
Tarleton State *	0	–	0	–	0	1	–	9	–	0
+ – Conference co-champions; ^ – NAIA playoff participant * – did not complete for conference title; Rankings from NAIA poll and AP small college poll

1970 Lone Star Conference football standings
	Conf.					Overall
Team	W		L		T	W		L		T
No. 1/7 Texas A&I $^	8	–	1	–	0	11	–	1	–	0
No. NR / T–20 Sam Houston State	7	–	2	–	0	8	–	2	–	1
Sul Ross	6	–	3	–	0	7	–	3	–	0
Angelo State	6	–	3	–	0	6	–	4	–	0
Southwest Texas State	4	–	5	–	0	6	–	5	–	0
Howard Payne	4	–	5	–	0	5	–	5	–	0
East Texas State	4	–	5	–	0	5	–	6	–	0
McMurry	4	–	5	–	0	5	–	6	–	0
Tarleton State	1	–	8	–	0	1	–	8	–	0
Stephen F. Austin	1	–	8	–	0	1	–	9	–	0
$ – Conference champion; ^ – NAIA Division I playoff participant; Rankings from NAIA Division I poll and AP small college poll

1971 Lone Star Conference football standings
	Conf.					Overall
Team	W		L		T	W		L		T
No. 3 Howard Payne +	7	–	1	–	1	10	–	1	–	1
No. 4 Southwest Texas State +	7	–	1	–	1	8	–	1	–	1
No. 13 Texas A&I	7	–	2	–	0	7	–	3	–	0
Angelo State	6	–	3	–	0	7	–	3	–	0
East Texas State	5	–	4	–	0	6	–	5	–	0
Sul Ross	3	–	6	–	0	4	–	6	–	1
Sam Houston State	3	–	6	–	0	4	–	7	–	0
Tarleton State	2	–	7	–	0	3	–	7	–	0
McMurry	2	–	7	–	0	2	–	8	–	0
Stephen F. Austin	2	–	7	–	0	2	–	8	–	0
+ – Conference co-champions; Rankings from NAIA Division I poll

1972 Lone Star Conference football standings
	Conf.					Overall
Team	W		L		T	W		L		T
No. 1 East Texas State $^	7	–	1	–	0	10	–	2	–	0
No. 12 Angelo State	6	–	2	–	0	8	–	3	–	0
Southwest Texas State	6	–	2	–	0	7	–	3	–	0
Howard Payne	4	–	4	–	0	5	–	4	–	0
Texas A&I	4	–	4	–	0	6	–	5	–	0
Sam Houston State	4	–	4	–	0	5	–	6	–	0
Sul Ross	3	–	5	–	0	5	–	6	–	0
Stephen F. Austin	2	–	6	–	0	2	–	7	–	0
Tarleton State	0	–	8	–	0	1	–	9	–	0
McMurry *	0	–	0	–	0	3	–	6	–	0
Abilene Christian *	0	–	0	–	0	3	–	8	–	0
$ – Conference champion; ^ – NAIA Division I playoff participant * – did not complete for conference title; Rankings from NAIA Division I poll

1973 Lone Star Conference football standings
	Conf.					Overall
Team	W		L		T	W		L		T
No. 1/7 Abilene Christian $^	9	–	0	–	0	11	–	1	–	0
No. 8 Howard Payne	8	–	1	–	0	8	–	3	–	0
Stephen F. Austin	6	–	3	–	0	9	–	3	–	0
East Texas State	6	–	3	–	0	7	–	4	–	0
Angelo State	5	–	4	–	0	5	–	4	–	2
Southwest Texas State	3	–	6	–	0	4	–	6	–	0
Sul Ross	3	–	6	–	0	3	–	7	–	0
Sam Houston State	2	–	7	–	0	2	–	8	–	0
Texas A&I	2	–	7	–	0	2	–	8	–	0
Tarleton State	1	–	8	–	0	1	–	9	–	0
$ – Conference champion; ^ – NAIA Division I playoff participant; Rankings from NAIA Division I poll and AP small college poll

1974 Lone Star Conference football standings
	Conf.					Overall
Team	W		L		T	W		L		T
No. 1/3 Texas A&I $^	9	–	0	–	0	13	–	0	–	0
No. 5 Stephen F. Austin	7	–	2	–	0	9	–	2	–	0
Abilene Christian	6	–	3	–	0	7	–	4	–	0
Southwest Texas State	6	–	3	–	0	6	–	4	–	0
East Texas State	5	–	4	–	0	7	–	4	–	0
Howard Payne	4	–	5	–	0	5	–	6	–	0
Sam Houston State	4	–	5	–	0	4	–	7	–	0
Angelo State	3	–	4	–	0	4	–	6	–	0
Sul Ross	1	–	8	–	0	1	–	9	–	0
Tarleton State	0	–	9	–	0	1	–	10	–	0
$ – Conference champion; ^ – NAIA Division I playoff participant; Rankings from NAIA Division I poll and AP small college poll

1975 Lone Star Conference football standings
	Conf.					Overall
Team	W		L		T	W		L		T
No. 1 Texas A&I $^	9	–	0	–	0	12	–	0	–	0
No. 6 Angelo State	7	–	1	–	1	8	–	2	–	1
No. T–17 Southwest Texas State	7	–	2	–	0	7	–	3	–	0
No. T–19 East Texas State	6	–	3	–	0	8	–	3	–	0
No. 16 Abilene Christian	5	–	3	–	1	6	–	3	–	1
Howard Payne	4	–	5	–	0	5	–	5	–	1
Sam Houston State	3	–	6	–	0	3	–	7	–	0
Stephen F. Austin	1	–	8	–	0	2	–	8	–	0
Sul Ross	1	–	8	–	0	1	–	10	–	0
Tarleton State	1	–	8	–	0	1	–	10	–	0
$ – Conference champion; ^ – NAIA Division I playoff participant; Rankings from NAIA Division I poll

1976 Lone Star Conference football standings
	Conf.					Overall
Team	W		L		T	W		L		T
No. 1 Texas A&I $^	7	–	0	–	0	13	–	0	–	0
No. 6 Abilene Christian	5	–	2	–	0	8	–	2	–	0
East Texas State	4	–	3	–	0	5	–	3	–	1
Southwest Texas State	4	–	3	–	0	5	–	5	–	0
Angelo State	3	–	3	–	1	5	–	5	–	1
Sam Houston State	2	–	5	–	0	3	–	5	–	1
Howard Payne	1	–	5	–	1	1	–	8	–	1
Stephen F. Austin	1	–	6	–	0	2	–	9	–	1
$ – Conference champion; ^ – NAIA Division I playoff participant; Rankings from NAIA Division I poll

1977 Lone Star Conference football standings
	Conf.					Overall
Team	W		L		T	W		L		T
No. 2 Abilene Christian +^	5	–	1	–	1	11	–	1	–	1
No. 3 Texas A&I +	5	–	1	–	1	8	–	1	–	1
No. 11 Angelo State	5	–	2	–	0	8	–	2	–	0
No. 15 Southwest Texas State	5	–	2	–	0	5	–	4	–	0
No. 13 East Texas State	4	–	3	–	0	7	–	4	–	0
Stephen F. Austin	2	–	5	–	0	2	–	8	–	0
Sam Houston State	1	–	6	–	0	1	–	10	–	0
Howard Payne	0	–	7	–	0	2	–	8	–	0
$ – Conference champion; ^ – NAIA Division I playoff participant; Rankings from NAIA Division I poll

1978 Lone Star Conference football standings
	Conf.					Overall
Team	W		L		T	W		L		T
No. 1 Angelo State $^	7	–	0	–	0	14	–	0	–	0
No. 11 Abilene Christian	5	–	2	–	0	7	–	3	–	0
Sam Houston State	4	–	3	–	0	6	–	5	–	0
No. 20 Texas A&I	4	–	3	–	0	6	–	5	–	0
Southwest Texas State	3	–	4	–	0	6	–	4	–	0
Stephen F. Austin	3	–	4	–	0	3	–	8	–	0
East Texas State	2	–	3	–	0	4	–	7	–	0
Howard Payne	0	–	7	–	0	2	–	8	–	0
$ – Conference champion; ^ – NAIA Division I playoff participant; Rankings from NAIA Division I poll

1979 Lone Star Conference football standings
	Conf.					Overall
Team	W		L		T	W		L		T
No. 2 Texas A&I $^	6	–	1	–	0	12	–	1	–	0
No. 17 Stephen F. Austin	5	–	2	–	0	8	–	3	–	0
No. 7 Angelo State ^	5	–	2	–	0	9	–	3	–	0
East Texas State	5	–	2	–	0	5	–	5	–	0
Abilene Christian	3	–	4	–	0	7	–	4	–	0
No. 19 Southwest Texas State	3	–	4	–	0	7	–	4	–	0
Howard Payne	1	–	6	–	0	2	–	8	–	0
Sam Houston State	0	–	7	–	0	1	–	9	–	0
$ – Conference champion; ^ – NAIA Division I playoff participant; Rankings from NAIA Division I poll

1980 Lone Star Conference football standings
	Conf.					Overall
Team	W		L		T	W		L		T
Southwest Texas State $	6	–	1	–	0	8	–	3	–	0
No. 2 Angelo State ^	5	–	1	–	1	8	–	2	–	1
Texas A&I	5	–	2	–	0	7	–	4	–	0
No. 8 East Texas State ^	4	–	2	–	1	8	–	3	–	1
Stephen F. Austin	4	–	3	–	0	4	–	6	–	0
Sam Houston State	2	–	5	–	0	3	–	7	–	0
Abilene Christian	1	–	6	–	0	2	–	8	–	0
Howard Payne	0	–	7	–	0	1	–	8	–	1
$ – Conference champion; ^ – NAIA Division I playoff participant; Rankings from NAIA Division I poll

1981 Lone Star Conference football standings
	Conf.					Overall
Team	W		L		T	W		L		T
No. 4 Southwest Texas State $^	6	–	1	–	0	13	–	1	–	0
No. 9 Texas A&I	5	–	2	–	0	9	–	2	–	0
Abilene Christian	5	–	2	–	0	8	–	2	–	0
Angelo State	5	–	2	–	0	8	–	3	–	0
No. 17 East Texas State	4	–	3	–	0	7	–	4	–	0
Sam Houston State	2	–	5	–	0	3	–	7	–	0
Howard Payne	1	–	6	–	0	3	–	7	–	0
Stephen F. Austin	0	–	7	–	0	1	–	10	–	0
$ – Conference champion; ^ – NCAA Division II playoff participant; Rankings from NCAA Division II Football Committee poll for Southwest Texas State and Texas A&I and NAIA Division I poll for East Texas State

1982 Lone Star Conference football standings
	Conf.					Overall
Team	W		L		T	W		L		T
No. 1 Southwest Texas State $^	7	–	0	–	0	14	–	0	–	0
Angelo State	4	–	3	–	0	7	–	3	–	0
East Texas State	4	–	3	–	0	6	–	4	–	0
Abilene Christian	4	–	3	–	0	6	–	4	–	0
Stephen F. Austin	4	–	3	–	0	6	–	5	–	0
Texas A&I	2	–	5	–	0	5	–	6	–	0
Howard Payne	1	–	6	–	0	3	–	7	–	0
Sam Houston State	1	–	6	–	0	3	–	8	–	0
$ – Conference champion; ^ – NCAA Division II playoff participant; Rankings from NCAA Division II Football Committee poll

1983 Lone Star Conference football standings
	Conf.					Overall
Team	W		L		T	W		L		T
No. 2 Southwest Texas State +^	6	–	1	–	0	9	–	2	–	0
East Texas State +	6	–	1	–	0	8	–	2	–	0
Stephen F. Austin	5	–	2	–	0	7	–	4	–	0
Abilene Christian	4	–	3	–	0	7	–	3	–	0
Angelo State	3	–	4	–	0	5	–	6	–	0
Texas A&I	2	–	5	–	0	2	–	9	–	0
Sam Houston State	1	–	6	–	0	4	–	7	–	0
Howard Payne	1	–	6	–	0	2	–	8	–	0
+ – Conference co-champions; ^ – NCAA Division II playoff participant; Rankings from NCAA Division II Football Committee poll

1984 Lone Star Conference football standings
	Conf.					Overall
Team	W		L		T	W		L		T
No. 10 Angelo State $	4	–	0	–	0	8	–	3	–	0
Texas A&I	3	–	1	–	0	6	–	5	–	0
Abilene Christian	2	–	2	–	0	3	–	7	–	0
East Texas State	1	–	3	–	0	5	–	5	–	0
Howard Payne	0	–	4	–	0	1	–	8	–	1
$ – Conference champion; Rankings from NCAA Division II Football Committee poll

1985 Lone Star Conference football standings
	Conf.					Overall
Team	W		L		T	W		L		T
Texas A&I $	5	–	0	–	0	8	–	3	–	0
Angelo State	3	–	2	–	0	7	–	4	–	0
Eastern New Mexico	3	–	2	–	0	5	–	5	–	0
Abilene Christian	2	–	3	–	0	5	–	4	–	2
East Texas State	2	–	3	–	0	5	–	5	–	0
Howard Payne	0	–	5	–	0	2	–	6	–	2
$ – Conference champion

1986 Lone Star Conference football standings
	Conf.					Overall
Team	W		L		T	W		L		T
West Texas State $	6	–	0	–	0	7	–	4	–	0
No. 8 Texas A&I	4	–	2	–	0	9	–	2	–	0
No. T–10 Abilene Christian	4	–	2	–	0	7	–	3	–	0
Eastern New Mexico	3	–	3	–	0	8	–	3	–	0
Angelo State	3	–	3	–	0	6	–	5	–	0
East Texas State	1	–	5	–	0	2	–	9	–	0
Howard Payne	0	–	6	–	0	0	–	10	–	0
$ – Conference champion; Rankings from NCAA Division II Football Committee poll

1987 Lone Star Conference football standings
	Conf.					Overall
Team	W		L		T	W		L		T
No. 1 Texas A&I +	4	–	1	–	0	9	–	2	–	0
No. 9 Angelo State +^	4	–	1	–	0	8	–	3	–	0
No. 13 Eastern New Mexico	3	–	2	–	0	9	–	2	–	0
Abilene Christian	2	–	3	–	0	5	–	6	–	0
West Texas State	2	–	3	–	0	5	–	6	–	0
East Texas State	0	–	5	–	0	2	–	9	–	0
+ – Conference co-champions; ^ – NCAA Division II playoff participant; Rankings from NCAA Division II Football Committee poll

1988 Lone Star Conference football standings
	Conf.					Overall
Team	W		L		T	W		L		T
No. 3 Texas A&I $^	6	–	1	–	0	10	–	3	–	0
No. 15 East Texas State	5	–	2	–	0	8	–	3	–	0
Angelo State	5	–	2	–	0	6	–	4	–	0
No. 18 Cameron	4	–	3	–	0	5	–	3	–	1
Central State (OK)	4	–	3	–	0	4	–	5	–	0
Abilene Christian	3	–	4	–	0	3	–	7	–	0
West Texas State	1	–	6	–	0	2	–	8	–	0
Eastern New Mexico	0	–	6	–	0	2	–	8	–	0
$ – Conference champion; ^ – NCAA Division II playoff participant; Rankings from NCAA Division II Football Committee poll for Texas A&I and East Texas State and NAIA Division I poll for Cameron

1989 Lone Star Conference football standings
	Conf.					Overall
Team	W		L		T	W		L		T
No. 1 Texas A&I $^	7	–	0	–	0	10	–	1	–	0
No. T–5 Angelo State ^	5	–	2	–	0	11	–	3	–	0
Eastern New Mexico	5	–	2	–	0	7	–	3	–	0
Abilene Christian	5	–	2	–	0	5	–	5	–	0
East Texas State	2	–	5	–	0	4	–	6	–	0
Cameron	2	–	5	–	0	3	–	7	–	0
West Texas State	2	–	5	–	0	3	–	8	–	0
Central State (OK)	0	–	7	–	0	0	–	10	–	1
$ – Conference champion; ^ – NCAA Division II playoff participant; Rankings from NCAA Division II Football Committee poll

1990 Lone Star Conference football standings
	Conf.					Overall
Team	W		L		T	W		L		T
No. 7 East Texas State $^	7	–	0	–	0	10	–	3	–	0
Angelo State	5	–	2	–	0	7	–	3	–	0
Eastern New Mexico	5	–	2	–	0	6	–	4	–	0
Texas A&I	5	–	2	–	0	6	–	4	–	0
Central State (OK)	3	–	4	–	0	4	–	6	–	0
Cameron	1	–	6	–	0	2	–	8	–	0
Abilene Christian	1	–	6	–	0	1	–	9	–	0
West Texas State	1	–	6	–	0	1	–	10	–	0
$ – Conference champion; ^ – NCAA Division II playoff participant; Rankings from NCAA Division II Football Committee poll

1991 Lone Star Conference football standings
	Conf.					Overall
Team	W		L		T	W		L		T
Eastern New Mexico $	5	–	1	–	0	7	–	3	–	1
No. 19 East Texas State ^	4	–	1	–	1	8	–	4	–	1
Angelo State	4	–	1	–	1	6	–	3	–	1
Texas A&I	4	–	2	–	0	7	–	3	–	0
Cameron	1	–	5	–	0	3	–	7	–	0
Central Oklahoma	1	–	5	–	0	3	–	7	–	0
Abilene Christian	1	–	5	–	0	1	–	10	–	0
$ – Conference champion; ^ – NCAA Division II playoff participant; Rankings from NCAA Division II Football Committee poll

1992 Lone Star Conference football standings
	Conf.					Overall
Team	W		L		T	W		L		T
No. 4 Texas A&I $^	6	–	0	–	0	9	–	3	–	0
No. 14 East Texas State	5	–	1	–	0	8	–	3	–	0
Angelo State	3	–	3	–	0	5	–	5	–	0
Eastern New Mexico	3	–	3	–	0	5	–	5	–	0
Central Oklahoma	2	–	4	–	0	6	–	4	–	0
Abilene Christian	2	–	5	–	0	3	–	6	–	0
Cameron	0	–	6	–	0	1	–	9	–	0
$ – Conference champion; ^ – NCAA Division II playoff participant; Rankings from NCAA Division II Football Committee poll

1993 Lone Star Conference football standings
	Conf.					Overall
Team	W		L		T	W		L		T
No. 19 Texas A&M–Kingsville $^	5	–	0	–	0	7	–	6	–	0
Abilene Christian	3	–	2	–	0	7	–	3	–	0
Angelo State	3	–	2	–	0	7	–	3	–	0
Central Oklahoma	2	–	3	–	0	7	–	3	–	0
East Texas State	1	–	4	–	0	5	–	6	–	0
Eastern New Mexico	1	–	4	–	0	1	–	8	–	1
$ – Conference champion; ^ – NCAA Division II playoff participant; Rankings from NCAA Division II Football Committee poll

1994 Lone Star Conference football standings
	Conf.					Overall
Team	W		L		T	W		L		T
No. 2 Texas A&M–Kingsville $^	5	–	0	–	0	12	–	2	–	0
No. 13 Angelo State ^	4	–	1	–	0	6	–	5	–	0
Central Oklahoma	2	–	2	–	1	6	–	3	–	1
East Texas State	2	–	3	–	0	5	–	5	–	0
Eastern New Mexico	1	–	3	–	1	6	–	4	–	1
Abilene Christian	0	–	5	–	0	3	–	7	–	0
$ – Conference champion; ^ – NCAA Division II playoff participant; Rankings from NCAA Division II Football Committee poll

1995 Lone Star Conference football standings
	Conf.					Overall
Team	W		L		T	W		L		T
No. 2 Texas A&M–Kingsville $^	7	–	0	–	0	11	–	2	–	0
No. 11 East Texas State ^	6	–	1	–	0	8	–	4	–	0
No. 15 Angelo State	4	–	2	–	1	6	–	3	–	1
Central Oklahoma	4	–	3	–	0	8	–	3	–	0
Eastern New Mexico	3	–	3	–	1	6	–	4	–	1
Abilene Christian	2	–	5	–	0	4	–	7	–	0
West Texas A&M	1	–	6	–	0	5	–	6	–	0
Tarleton State	0	–	7	–	0	1	–	10	–	0
$ – Conference champion; ^ – NCAA Division II playoff participant; Rankings from NCAA Division II Football Committee poll

1996 Lone Star Conference football standings
	Conf.			Overall
Team	W		L	W		L
No. 1 Texas A&M–Kingsville $^	7	–	0	8	–	3
No. 9 Central Oklahoma ^	5	–	2	9	–	3
Texas A&M–Commerce	4	–	3	7	–	3
Angelo State	4	–	3	6	–	4
Abilene Christian	4	–	3	6	–	4
Tarleton State	2	–	5	5	–	5
Eastern New Mexico	2	–	5	3	–	8
West Texas A&M	0	–	7	1	–	9
$ – Conference champion; ^ – NCAA Division II playoff participant; Rankings from NCAA Division II Football Committee poll

1997 Lone Star Conference football standings
	Conf.			Overall
Team	W		L	W		L
Overall*
No. 4 Texas A&M–Kingsville $^	9	–	0	9	–	2
No. 6 Angelo State ^	8	–	1	10	–	2
Central Oklahoma	7	–	2	9	–	2
West Texas A&M	6	–	3	7	–	4
SW Oklahoma State	5	–	4	5	–	5
Abilene Christian	5	–	4	7	–	4
Northeastern State	4	–	4	4	–	7
SE Oklahoma State	3	–	5	3	–	7
Harding	3	–	5	5	–	5
Ouachita Baptist	3	–	5	4	–	6
Texas A&M–Commerce	3	–	6	3	–	8
Eastern New Mexico	3	–	6	5	–	6
Midwestern State	3	–	6	3	–	7
Tarleton State	3	–	6	4	–	7
East Central	0	–	8	0	–	10
North
Central Oklahoma x	5	–	1	9	–	2
SW Oklahoma State x	5	–	1	5	–	5
Northeastern State	4	–	2	4	–	7
Harding	3	–	3	5	–	5
Ouachita Baptist	3	–	3	4	–	6
SE Oklahoma State	1	–	5	3	–	7
East Central	0	–	6	0	–	10
South
No. 4 Texas A&M–Kingsville x$^	7	–	0	9	–	2
No. 6 Angelo State ^	6	–	1	10	–	2
Abilene Christian	4	–	3	7	–	4
West Texas A&M	4	–	3	7	–	4
Eastern New Mexico	2	–	5	5	–	6
Tarleton State	2	–	5	4	–	7
Texas A&M–Commerce	3	–	5	3	–	8
Midwestern State	1	–	6	3	–	7
$ – Conference champion; ^ – NCAA Division II playoff participant; * – The LSC counted separate overall and division standings.; Rankings from NCAA Division II Football Committee poll

1998 Lone Star Conference football standings
	Conf.			Overall
Team	W		L	W		L
Overall*
No. 1 Central Oklahoma $^	9	–	0	12	–	1
No. 11 Texas A&M–Kingsville ^	8	–	1	11	–	3
No. 15 West Texas A&M	7	–	2	8	–	3
Northeastern State	6	–	2	8	–	2
Eastern New Mexico	6	–	3	8	–	3
Angelo State	6	–	3	6	–	4
Harding	5	–	3	7	–	4
SE Oklahoma State	4	–	4	5	–	5
Ouachita Baptist	3	–	5	3	–	7
Tarleton State	3	–	6	3	–	8
Abilene Christian	3	–	5	4	–	6
Texas A&M–Commerce	3	–	6	3	–	8
East Central	1	–	7	2	–	8
Midwestern State	1	–	8	2	–	9
SW Oklahoma State	0	–	9	0	–	10
North
No. 1 Central Oklahoma x$^	6	–	0	12	–	1
Northeastern State	5	–	1	8	–	2
Harding	4	–	2	7	–	4
SE Oklahoma State	3	–	3	5	–	5
Ouachita Baptist	2	–	4	3	–	7
East Central	1	–	5	2	–	8
SW Oklahoma State	0	–	6	0	–	10
South
No. 11 Texas A&M–Kingsville x^	7	–	0	11	–	3
No. 15 West Texas A&M	5	–	2	8	–	3
Eastern New Mexico	4	–	3	8	–	3
Angelo State	4	–	3	6	–	4
Tarleton State	3	–	4	3	–	8
Abilene Christian	2	–	5	4	–	6
Texas A&M–Commerce	2	–	5	3	–	8
Midwestern State	1	–	6	2	–	9
$ – Conference champion; ^ – NCAA Division II playoff participant; * – The LSC counted separate overall and division standings.; Rankings from NCAA Division II Football Committee poll

1999 Lone Star Conference football standings
	Conf.			Overall
Team	W		L	W		L
Overall
Northeastern State $^	7	–	2	10	–	4
No. 17 SE Oklahoma State $	6	–	2	7	–	4
No. 18 Central Oklahoma $^	6	–	2	8	–	3
Eastern New Mexico	6	–	3	8	–	3
Angelo State	6	–	3	8	–	3
Texas A&M–Kingsville	5	–	4	5	–	6
Tarleton State	5	–	4	5	–	6
SW Oklahoma State	4	–	5	5	–	5
Abilene Christian	4	–	5	4	–	6
Texas A&M–Commerce	4	–	5	4	–	7
Harding	3	–	5	5	–	5
East Central	3	–	6	3	–	7
Midwestern State	3	–	6	4	–	7
West Texas A&M	2	–	7	3	–	8
Ouachita Baptist	1	–	7	3	–	7
North
Northeastern State x$^	5	–	1	10	–	4
No. 17 SE Oklahoma State $	4	–	2	7	–	4
No. 18 Central Oklahoma $^	4	–	2	8	–	3
East Central	3	–	3	3	–	7
SW Oklahoma State	3	–	3	5	–	5
Harding	2	–	4	5	–	5
Ouachita Baptist	0	–	6	3	–	7
South
Angelo State x	5	–	2	8	–	3
Texas A&M–Commerce	4	–	3	4	–	7
Texas A&M–Kingsville	4	–	3	5	–	6
Eastern New Mexico	4	–	3	8	–	3
Tarleton State	3	–	4	5	–	6
Abilene Christian	3	–	4	4	–	6
Midwestern State	3	–	4	4	–	7
West Texas A&M	2	–	5	3	–	8
$ – Conference champion; x – Division champion/co-champions; ^ – NCAA Division II playoff participant; The LSC counted separate overall and division standings. The conference recognized tri-champions in 1999. Northeastern State's 7th win resulted from an uneven number of conference games played.; Rankings from NCAA Division II Football Committee poll

2000 Lone Star Conference football standings
	Conf.			Overall
Team	W		L	W		L
Overall*
No. 2 Northeastern State $^	7	–	1	9	–	1
Central Oklahoma	5	–	3	5	–	5
No. 7 Midwestern State	5	–	3	7	–	4
No. 10 Eastern New Mexico	5	–	3	6	–	4
East Central	5	–	3	6	–	5
Tarleton State	5	–	4	6	–	5
No. 8 SW Oklahoma State	4	–	4	6	–	4
West Texas A&M	4	–	4	5	–	6
Angelo State	4	–	4	6	–	4
Texas A&M–Commerce	4	–	5	5	–	6
Texas A&M–Kingsville	4	–	5	4	–	7
Abilene Christian	1	–	7	1	–	9
SE Oklahoma State	0	–	7	1	–	9
North
No. 2 Northeastern State x$^	5	–	0	9	–	1
No. 7 Midwestern State	3	–	2	7	–	4
Central Oklahoma	3	–	2	5	–	5
No. 8 SW Oklahoma State	2	–	3	6	–	4
East Central	2	–	3	6	–	5
SE Oklahoma State	0	–	5	1	–	9
South
No. 10 Eastern New Mexico x	4	–	2	6	–	4
Angelo State x	4	–	2	6	–	4
Tarleton State	3	–	3	6	–	5
West Texas A&M	3	–	3	5	–	6
Texas A&M–Commerce	3	–	3	5	–	6
Texas A&M–Kingsville	3	–	3	4	–	7
Abilene Christian	1	–	5	1	–	9
$ – Conference champion; ^ – NCAA Division II playoff participant; * – The LSC counted separate overall and division standings.; Rankings from AFCA West Region poll

2001 Lone Star Conference football standings
	Conf.			Overall
Team	W		L	W		L
Overall*
No. 17 Tarleton State	8	–	1	9	–	2
No. 11 Texas A&M–Kingsville	8	–	1	9	–	1
Angelo State	6	–	2	6	–	4
East Central	6	–	3	6	–	4
Midwestern State	6	–	3	7	–	4
Texas A&M–Commerce	5	–	4	7	–	4
Eastern New Mexico	4	–	4	6	–	4
Northeastern State	4	–	4	5	–	5
Abilene Christian	3	–	6	3	–	8
SE Oklahoma State	2	–	6	3	–	7
SW Oklahoma State	2	–	6	4	–	6
Central Oklahoma	1	–	7	3	–	8
West Texas A&M	0	–	8	2	–	9
North
Midwestern State	4	–	1	7	–	4
East Central	3	–	2	6	–	4
Northeastern State	3	–	2	5	–	5
SE Oklahoma State	2	–	3	3	–	7
SW Oklahoma State	2	–	3	4	–	6
Central Oklahoma	1	–	4	3	–	8
South
No. 17 Tarleton State	5	–	1	9	–	2
No. 11 Texas A&M–Kingsville	5	–	1	9	–	1
Angelo State	4	–	2	6	–	4
Texas A&M–Commerce	3	–	3	7	–	4
Eastern New Mexico	2	–	4	6	–	4
Abilene Christian	2	–	4	3	–	8
West Texas A&M	0	–	6	2	–	9
$ – Conference champion; ^ – NCAA Division II playoff participant; * – The LSC counted separate overall and division standings.; Rankings from AFCA poll

2002 Lone Star Conference football standings
	Conf.			Overall
Team	W		L	W		L
Overall*
No. 20 Texas A&M–Kingsville $^	7	–	1	10	–	3
No. 17 Tarleton State	6	–	2	9	–	2
Abilene Christian	6	–	2	6	–	4
Midwestern State	6	–	2	7	–	4
No. 25 Eastern New Mexico	5	–	3	8	–	3
SE Oklahoma State	5	–	3	7	–	3
SW Oklahoma State	5	–	3	7	–	4
Central Oklahoma	4	–	4	5	–	6
East Central	3	–	5	3	–	8
Northeastern State	2	–	6	4	–	7
Angelo State	2	–	6	2	–	8
Texas A&M–Commerce	2	–	6	2	–	8
West Texas A&M	0	–	8	0	–	11
North
No. 17 Tarleton State x	4	–	1	9	–	2
SE Oklahoma State	3	–	2	7	–	3
SW Oklahoma State	3	–	2	7	–	4
Central Oklahoma	2	–	3	5	–	6
East Central	2	–	3	3	–	8
Northeastern State	1	–	4	4	–	7
South
No. 20 Texas A&M–Kingsville $^	5	–	1	10	–	3
Abilene Christian x	5	–	1	6	–	4
Midwestern State	4	–	2	7	–	4
No. 25 Eastern New Mexico	4	–	2	8	–	3
Angelo State	2	–	4	2	–	8
Texas A&M–Commerce	1	–	5	2	–	8
West Texas A&M	0	–	6	0	–	11
$ – Conference champion; ^ – NCAA Division II playoff participant; * – The LSC counted separate overall and division standings.; Rankings from AFCA poll

2003 Lone Star Conference football standings
	Conf.			Overall
Team	W		L	W		L
Overall*
No. 3 Texas A&M–Kingsville $^	8	–	0	11	–	2
SE Oklahoma State	6	–	2	7	–	3
No. 20 Central Oklahoma ^	6	–	2	9	–	3
Midwestern State	6	–	2	7	–	3
No. 21 Tarleton State ^	6	–	2	8	–	4
Abilene Christian	5	–	3	6	–	4
Angelo State	3	–	5	3	–	8
East Central	3	–	5	3	–	8
Eastern New Mexico	3	–	5	6	–	5
Northeastern State	2	–	6	3	–	7
SW Oklahoma State	2	–	6	5	–	6
West Texas A&M	2	–	6	3	–	8
Texas A&M–Commerce	0	–	8	1	–	10
North
No. 21 Tarleton State x^	4	–	1	8	–	4
SE Oklahoma State	3	–	2	7	–	3
No. 20 Central Oklahoma ^	3	–	2	9	–	3
Northeastern State	2	–	3	3	–	7
East Central	2	–	3	3	–	8
SW Oklahoma State	1	–	4	5	–	6
South
No. 3 Texas A&M–Kingsville x$^	6	–	0	11	–	2
Abilene Christian	5	–	1	6	–	4
Midwestern State	4	–	2	7	–	3
Eastern New Mexico	2	–	4	6	–	5
West Texas A&M	2	–	4	3	–	8
Angelo State	2	–	4	3	–	8
Texas A&M–Commerce	0	–	6	1	–	10
$ – Conference champion; ^ – NCAA Division II playoff participant; * – The LSC counted separate overall and division standings.; Rankings from AFCA poll

2004 Lone Star Conference football standings
	Conf.			Overall
Team	W		L	W		L
Overall*
No. 6 Texas A&M–Kingsville $^	8	–	1	9	–	2
No. 23 SE Oklahoma State ^	7	–	2	8	–	3
No. 21 Central Oklahoma	7	–	2	8	–	2
Midwestern State ^	7	–	2	8	–	3
Tarleton State	6	–	3	7	–	4
Abilene Christian	5	–	4	5	–	5
East Central	5	–	4	6	–	4
Eastern New Mexico	5	–	4	6	–	5
Texas A&M–Commerce	4	–	5	4	–	6
Angelo State	2	–	7	2	–	9
West Texas A&M	2	–	7	2	–	8
SW Oklahoma State	1	–	8	1	–	9
Northeastern State	0	–	9	0	–	10
North
No. 21 Central Oklahoma x	4	–	1	8	–	2
No. 23 SE Oklahoma State x^	4	–	1	8	–	3
Tarleton State	3	–	2	7	–	4
East Central	3	–	2	6	–	4
SW Oklahoma State	1	–	4	1	–	9
Northeastern State	0	–	5	0	–	10
South
No. 6 Texas A&M–Kingsville x$^	5	–	1	9	–	2
Midwestern State x^	5	–	1	8	–	3
Eastern New Mexico	4	–	2	6	–	5
Abilene Christian	3	–	3	5	–	5
Texas A&M–Commerce	2	–	4	4	–	6
West Texas A&M	1	–	5	2	–	8
Angelo State	1	–	5	2	–	9
$ – Conference champion; ^ – NCAA Division II playoff participant; * – The LSC counted separate overall and division standings.; Rankings from AFCA Poll

2005 Lone Star Conference football standings
	Conf.			Overall
Team	W		L	W		L
Overall*
No. 15 West Texas A&M $^	8	–	1	10	–	2
SE Oklahoma State	7	–	2	8	–	2
No. 23 Angelo State ^	7	–	2	9	–	3
Tarleton State	6	–	3	7	–	3
Midwestern State	5	–	4	6	–	4
Texas A&M–Commerce	5	–	4	5	–	5
Texas A&M–Kingsville	5	–	4	6	–	4
Abilene Christian	4	–	5	4	–	6
Eastern New Mexico	4	–	5	5	–	6
Central Oklahoma	3	–	6	3	–	7
East Central	2	–	7	3	–	7
Northeastern State	2	–	7	2	–	8
SW Oklahoma State	0	–	9	1	–	10
North Division
SE Oklahoma State x	5	–	0	8	–	2
Texas A&M–Commerce	4	–	2	5	–	5
Central Oklahoma	2	–	3	3	–	7
East Central	2	–	3	3	–	7
Northeastern State	2	–	3	2	–	8
SW Oklahoma State	0	–	5	1	–	10
South Division
No. 15 West Texas A&M x$^	6	–	1	10	–	2
No. 23 Angelo State ^	4	–	2	9	–	3
Tarleton State	3	–	3	7	–	3
Midwestern State	3	–	3	6	–	4
Texas A&M–Kingsville	2	–	4	6	–	4
Abilene Christian	2	–	4	4	–	6
Eastern New Mexico	2	–	4	5	–	6
$ – Conference champion; ^ – NCAA Division II playoff participant; * – The LSC counted separate overall and division standings.; Rankings from AFCA Poll

2006 Lone Star Conference football standings
	Conf.			Overall
Team	W		L	W		L
Overall*
No. 10 W. Texas A&M $^	8	–	1	11	–	2
No. 17 Midwestern St. ^	7	–	2	10	–	3
No. 20 Abilene Christian ^	7	–	2	8	–	3
Tarleton State	6	–	3	6	–	4
SE Oklahoma State	5	–	4	6	–	4
Central Oklahoma	4	–	5	5	–	6
SW Oklahoma State	4	–	5	6	–	5
Northeastern State	4	–	5	4	–	6
Texas A&M–Commerce	4	–	5	5	–	5
Texas A&M–Kingsville	2	–	7	3	–	8
East Central	2	–	7	2	–	8
Eastern New Mexico	2	–	7	3	–	7
Angelo State	2	–	7	3	–	7
North Division
SE Oklahoma State x	4	–	1	6	–	4
SW Oklahoma State	3	–	2	6	–	5
Northeastern State	3	–	2	4	–	6
Texas A&M–Commerce	2	–	3	5	–	5
Central Oklahoma	2	–	3	5	–	6
East Central	1	–	4	2	–	8
South Division
No. 10 W. Texas A&M x$^	5	–	1	11	–	2
Tarleton State x	5	–	1	6	–	4
No. 17 Midwestern St. ^	4	–	2	10	–	3
No. 20 Abilene Christian ^	4	–	2	8	–	3
Angelo State	2	–	4	3	–	7
Eastern New Mexico	1	–	5	3	–	7
Texas A&M–Kingsville	0	–	6	3	–	8
$ – Conference champion; ^ – NCAA Division II playoff participant; * – The LSC counted separate overall and division standings.; Rankings from AFCA Poll

2007 Lone Star Conference football standings
	Conf.			Overall
Team	W		L	W		L
Overall*
No. 8 W. Texas A&M $^	9	–	0	12	–	1
No. 15 Abilene Christian ^†	8	–	1	10	–	3
No. 21 Tarleton State	7	–	2	9	–	2
No. 25 Midwestern State	6	–	3	8	–	3
Texas A&M–Commerce	5	–	4	5	–	6
SW Oklahoma State	4	–	5	6	–	5
Central Oklahoma	4	–	5	4	–	6
Eastern New Mexico	3	–	6	5	–	6
SE Oklahoma State	3	–	6	4	–	6
Northeastern State	3	–	6	3	–	7
Texas A&M–Kingsville	3	–	6	3	–	8
Angelo State	2	–	7	2	–	8
East Central	2	–	7	2	–	9
North
SW Oklahoma State x	3	–	2	6	–	5
Texas A&M–Commerce x	3	–	2	5	–	6
SE Oklahoma State x	3	–	2	4	–	6
Central Oklahoma x	3	–	2	4	–	6
Northeastern State x	3	–	2	3	–	7
East Central	0	–	5	2	–	9
South
No. 8 W. Texas A&M $^	6	–	0	12	–	1
No. 15 Abilene Christian ^†	5	–	1	10	–	3
No. 21 Tarleton State	4	–	2	9	–	2
No. 25 Midwestern State	3	–	3	8	–	3
Texas A&M–Kingsville	2	–	4	3	–	8
Angelo State	1	–	5	2	–	8
Eastern New Mexico	0	–	6	5	–	6
$ – Conference champion; ^ – NCAA Division II playoff participant; * – The LSC counted separate overall and division standings. † – Abilene Christian vacated all ten wins.; Rankings from AFCA Poll

2008 Lone Star Conference football standings
	Conf.			Overall
Team	W		L	W		L
Overall*
No. 5 Abilene Christian $^	9	–	0	11	–	1
No. 10 West Texas A&M ^	8	–	1	11	–	2
Tarleton State	6	–	3	8	–	3
Texas A&M–Kingsville	6	–	3	7	–	4
Central Oklahoma	6	–	3	7	–	4
SE Oklahoma State	6	–	3	6	–	5
Midwestern State	5	–	4	6	–	4
Texas A&M–Commerce	5	–	4	5	–	5
Angelo State	3	–	6	3	–	8
East Central	2	–	7	3	–	8
SW Oklahoma State	1	–	8	3	–	8
Eastern New Mexico †	1	–	8	2	–	9
Northeastern State	0	–	9	1	–	10
North Division
Central Oklahoma x	5	–	0	7	–	4
SE Oklahoma State	4	–	1	6	–	5
Texas A&M–Commerce	3	–	2	5	–	5
East Central	2	–	3	3	–	8
SW Oklahoma State	1	–	4	3	–	8
Northeastern State	0	–	5	1	–	10
South Division
No. 5 Abilene Christian x$^	6	–	0	11	–	1
No. 10 West Texas A&M ^	5	–	1	11	–	2
Tarleton State	3	–	3	8	–	3
Texas A&M–Kingsville	3	–	3	7	–	4
Midwestern State	3	–	3	6	–	4
Angelo State	1	–	5	3	–	8
Eastern New Mexico †	0	–	6	2	–	9
$ – Conference champion; ^ – NCAA Division II playoff participant; * – The LSC counted separate overall and division standings. † – Eastern New Mexico vacated both wins.; Rankings from AFCA Poll

2009 Lone Star Conference football standings
	Conf.			Overall
Team	W		L	W		L
Overall*
No. 10 Tarleton State +^	7	–	2	10	–	3
No. 14 Midwestern St. +^	7	–	2	9	–	3
No. 16 Texas A&M–Kingsville +^	7	–	2	9	–	3
No. 13 Abilene Christian ^	6	–	3	9	–	4
West Texas A&M #	6	–	3	7	–	5
SE Oklahoma State	5	–	4	7	–	4
Angelo State	5	–	4	6	–	5
Texas A&M–Commerce	5	–	4	5	–	5
Central Oklahoma	4	–	5	4	–	7
Eastern New Mexico †	2	–	7	3	–	8
Northeastern State	2	–	7	2	–	9
SW Oklahoma State	1	–	8	1	–	10
East Central	0	–	9	0	–	11
North
Texas A&M–Commerce x	5	–	0	5	–	5
SE Oklahoma State	4	–	1	7	–	4
Central Oklahoma	3	–	2	4	–	7
Northeastern State	2	–	3	2	–	9
SW Oklahoma State	1	–	4	1	–	10
East Central	0	–	5	0	–	11
South
No. 10 Tarleton State x+^	4	–	2	10	–	3
No. 14 Midwestern St. x+^	4	–	2	9	–	3
No. 16 Texas A&M–Kingsville x+^	4	–	2	9	–	3
West Texas A&M # x	4	–	2	7	–	5
No. 13 Abilene Christian ^	3	–	3	9	–	4
Angelo State	2	–	4	6	–	5
Eastern New Mexico †	0	–	6	3	–	8
+ – Conference co-champions; ^ – NCAA Division II playoff participant; * – The LSC counted separate overall and division standings. # – Kanza Bowl participant † – Eastern New Mexico vacated all three wins; Rankings from AFCA Poll

2010 Lone Star Conference football standings
	Conf.			Overall
Team	W		L	W		L
Overall*
No. 8 Abilene Christian $^	10	–	0	11	–	1
No. 9 Texas A&M–Kingsville ^	9	–	1	10	–	2
No. 18 W. Texas A&M ^	8	–	2	8	–	4
Midwestern State #	7	–	3	8	–	4
Northeastern State	6	–	4	6	–	5
East Central	5	–	5	5	–	6
Angelo State	5	–	5	5	–	5
SW Oklahoma State	4	–	6	4	–	7
Eastern New Mexico †	4	–	6	5	–	6
SE Oklahoma State	3	–	7	3	–	8
Tarleton State	3	–	7	3	–	8
Incarnate Word	3	–	7	3	–	8
Central Oklahoma	2	–	8	2	–	9
Texas A&M–Commerce	2	–	8	3	–	8
North
Northeastern State x	5	–	1	6	–	5
East Central x	5	–	1	5	–	6
SW Oklahoma State	4	–	2	4	–	7
Eastern New Mexico †	3	–	3	5	–	6
SE Oklahoma State	2	–	4	3	–	8
Central Oklahoma	1	–	5	2	–	9
Texas A&M–Commerce	1	–	5	3	–	8
South
No. 8 Abilene Christian x$^	6	–	0	11	–	1
No. 9 Texas A&M–Kingsville ^	5	–	1	10	–	2
No. 18 W. Texas A&M ^	4	–	2	8	–	4
Midwestern State #	3	–	3	8	–	4
Tarleton State	2	–	4	3	–	8
Angelo State	1	–	5	5	–	5
Incarnate Word	0	–	6	3	–	8
$ – Conference champion; ^ – NCAA Division II playoff participant; * – The LSC counted separate overall and division standings. † – Eastern New Mexico vacated all five wins. # – Kanza Bowl participant; Rankings from AFCA Poll

2011 Lone Star Conference football standings
	Conf.			Overall
Team	W		L	W		L
No. 7 Midwestern State $^	8	–	0	10	–	1
No. 16 Abilene Christian ^	7	–	1	8	–	3
No. 25 West Texas A&M #	6	–	2	8	–	3
Tarleton State	5	–	3	6	–	5
Texas A&M–Kingsville	4	–	4	6	–	5
Angelo State	2	–	6	5	–	6
Incarnate Word	2	–	6	2	–	8
Eastern New Mexico †	1	–	7	2	–	9
Texas A&M–Commerce	1	–	7	1	–	9
+ – Conference co-champions; ^ – NCAA Division II playoff participant; # – Kanza Bowl participant † – Eastern New Mexico vacated both wins; Rankings from AFCA poll

2012 Lone Star Conference football standings
	Conf.			Overall
Team	W		L	W		L
No. 16 Midwestern State +^	7	–	1	9	–	2
No. 4 West Texas A&M +^	7	–	1	12	–	3
Tarleton State	5	–	3	6	–	4
Texas A&M–Kingsville #	5	–	3	6	–	6
Abilene Christian	4	–	4	7	–	4
Angelo State	4	–	4	5	–	6
Eastern New Mexico †	2	–	6	3	–	7
Incarnate Word	1	–	7	2	–	9
Texas A&M–Commerce	1	–	7	1	–	9
+ – Conference co-champions; ^ – NCAA Division II playoff participant; # – Kanza Bowl participant † – Eastern New Mexico vacated all three wins; Rankings from AFCA poll

2013 Lone Star Conference football standings
	Conf.			Overall
Team	W		L	W		L
Eastern New Mexico +	5	–	1	7	–	3
Tarleton State +	5	–	1	7	–	3
No. 11 West Texas A&M ^	4	–	2	11	–	3
Midwestern State	3	–	3	7	–	3
Texas A&M–Commerce #	2	–	4	7	–	5
Angelo State	2	–	4	5	–	6
Texas A&M–Kingsville	0	–	6	2	–	8
+ – Conference co-champions; ^ – NCAA Division II playoff participant; # – Live United Texarkana Bowl participant; Rankings from AFCA poll

2014 Lone Star Conference football standings
	Conf.			Overall
Team	W		L	W		L
Texas A&M–Commerce # $	6	–	1	9	–	3
No. 20 Angelo State ^	5	–	2	9	–	3
Midwestern State	5	–	2	6	–	4
West Texas A&M †	4	–	3	6	–	5
Tarleton State	4	–	3	5	–	5
Eastern New Mexico	3	–	4	7	–	4
McMurry @	1	–	6	2	–	8
Texas A&M–Kingsville	0	–	7	2	–	9
$ – Conference champion; ^ – NCAA Division II playoff participant; # – C.H.A.M.P.S. Heart of Texas Bowl participant @– Provisional Division III member † – West Texas A&M vacated 4 wins, including 3 conference wins; Rankings from AFCA poll

2015 Lone Star Conference football standings
	Conf.			Overall
Team	W		L	W		L
No. 23 Texas A&M–Commerce $^	6	–	0	8	–	4
No. 9 Midwestern State ^	5	–	1	10	–	2
Angelo State	3	–	3	7	–	4
West Texas A&M	3	–	3	6	–	4
Eastern New Mexico #	3	–	3	6	–	6
Tarleton State	1	–	5	3	–	7
Texas A&M–Kingsville	0	–	6	2	–	9
$ – Conference champion; ^ – NCAA Division II playoff participant; # – C.H.A.M.P.S. Heart of Texas Bowl participant; Rankings from AFCA poll

2016 Lone Star Conference football standings
	Conf.			Overall
Team	W		L	W		L
No. 9 Texas A&M–Commerce $^	8	–	1	10	–	2
No. 24 Midwestern State ^	7	–	2	8	–	3
Texas A&M–Kingsville #	6	–	3	9	–	3
Eastern New Mexico #	6	–	3	7	–	5
West Texas A&M	5	–	4	6	–	5
Tarleton State	5	–	4	5	–	6
Angelo State	4	–	5	5	–	6
Western New Mexico	3	–	6	3	–	8
Oklahoma Panhandle State	1	–	8	2	–	9
UT Permian Basin	0	–	9	2	–	9
$ – Conference champion; ^ – NCAA Division II playoff participant; # – bowl participant (Texas A&M–Kingsville - Live United Texarkana Bowl, Eastern New Mexico - C.H.A.M.P.S. Heart of Texas Bowl); Rankings from AFCA poll

2017 Lone Star Conference football standings
	Conf.			Overall
Team	W		L	W		L
No. 11 Midwestern State $^	8	–	0	10	–	1
No. 1 Texas A&M–Commerce ^	7	–	1	14	–	1
Eastern New Mexico	6	–	2	8	–	2
Tarleton State #	4	–	4	6	–	6
Angelo State #	4	–	4	6	–	5
Western New Mexico	3	–	5	4	–	7
Texas A&M–Kingsville	2	–	6	4	–	7
West Texas A&M	1	–	7	3	–	8
UT Permian Basin	1	–	7	2	–	9
$ – Conference champion; ^ – NCAA Division II playoff participant; # – bowl participant (Tarleton State - Heritage Bowl, Angelo State - C.H.A.M.P.S. Heart of Texas Bowl); Rankings from AFCA poll

2018 Lone Star Conference football standings
	Conf.			Overall
Team	W		L	W		L
No. 5 Tarleton State $^	8	–	0	12	–	1
No. 9 Texas A&M–Commerce ^	7	–	1	10	–	3
No. 25 Midwestern State	6	–	2	8	–	2
Angelo State #	4	–	4	6	–	6
West Texas A&M	4	–	4	6	–	5
Eastern New Mexico	4	–	4	5	–	6
Texas A&M–Kingsville	2	–	6	4	–	7
UT Permian Basin	1	–	7	2	–	9
Western New Mexico	0	–	8	0	–	10
$ – Conference champion; ^ – NCAA Division II playoff participant; # – C.H.A.M.P.S. Heart of Texas Bowl participant; Rankings from AFCA poll

2019 Lone Star Conference football standings
	Conf.			Overall
Team	W		L	W		L
No. 9 Tarleton State $^	8	–	0	11	–	1
No. 11 Texas A&M–Commerce ^	7	–	1	10	–	3
Angelo State	5	–	3	8	–	3
West Texas A&M	5	–	3	8	–	3
Eastern New Mexico #	4	–	4	8	–	4
Midwestern State	3	–	5	5	–	6
UT Permian Basin	2	–	6	4	–	7
Texas A&M–Kingsville	1	–	7	2	–	9
Western New Mexico	1	–	7	1	–	10
$ – Conference champion; ^ – NCAA Division II playoff participant; # – Heritage Bowl participant; Rankings from AFCA Coaches poll

2020 Lone Star Conference football standings
	Conf.			Overall
Team	W		L	W		L
UT Permian Basin		–		5	–	0
West Texas A&M		–		3	–	3
Angelo State		–		2	–	2
Midwestern State		–		1	–	2
Western New Mexico		–		0	–	1
Texas A&M–Kingsville		–		0	–	2
Notes: Due to COVID-19, the Lone South Conference suspended the fall 2020 football season. The conference also announced no in-conference competition for spring 2021 play. Schools scheduled own games if desired to play either in the fall or spring. Eastern New Mexico and Texas A&M–Commerce opted out of the season.

2021 Lone Star Conference football standings
	Conf.			Overall
Team	W		L	W		L
Midwestern State $	6	–	1	7	–	3
No. 11 Angelo State ^	5	–	2	11	–	3
West Texas A&M	5	–	2	7	–	4
Texas A&M–Commerce	5	–	2	7	–	4
Texas A&M–Kingsville	3	–	4	5	–	5
UT Permian Basin #	3	–	4	5	–	6
Eastern New Mexico	1	–	6	3	–	7
Western New Mexico	0	–	7	1	–	9
$ – Conference champion; ^ – NCAA Division II playoff participant; # – Heritage Bowl participant; Rankings from AFCA Poll

2022 Lone Star Conference football standings
	Conf.			Overall
Team	W		L	W		L
No. 7 Angelo State $^	9	–	0	12	–	1
Central Washington	6	–	3	6	–	4
Texas A&M–Kingsville #	5	–	4	7	–	5
Midwestern State	5	–	4	6	–	5
Western New Mexico	5	–	4	6	–	5
Western Oregon	5	–	4	6	–	5
UT Permian Basin	4	–	5	5	–	6
West Texas A&M	3	–	6	5	–	6
Eastern New Mexico	2	–	7	3	–	8
Simon Fraser	1	–	8	1	–	9
$ – Conference champion; ^ – NCAA Division II playoff participant; # – Heritage Bowl participant; Rankings from AFCA Poll

2023 Lone Star Conference football standings
	Conf.			Overall
Team	W		L	W		L
No. 18 UT Permian Basin $^	8	–	0	10	–	2
No. 17 Central Washington ^	7	–	1	9	–	4
Angelo State	6	–	2	7	–	3
Texas A&M–Kingsville	5	–	3	7	–	3
Midwestern State	3	–	5	4	–	6
Eastern New Mexico	2	–	6	5	–	6
West Texas A&M	2	–	6	3	–	7
Western Oregon	2	–	6	3	–	8
Western New Mexico	1	–	7	2	–	8
$ – Conference champion; ^ – NCAA Division II playoff participant; Rankings from AFCA Poll

2024 Lone Star Conference football standings
	Conf.			Overall
Team	W		L	W		L
No. 20 Angelo State $^	9	–	0	9	–	3
No. 24 Central Washington ^	7	–	2	8	–	4
Texas A&M–Kingsville	6	–	3	7	–	4
UT Permian Basin #	6	–	3	7	–	5
Western Oregon	6	–	3	6	–	5
West Texas A&M	5	–	4	5	–	6
Midwestern State	3	–	6	4	–	7
Sul Ross*	2	–	7	3	–	8
Eastern New Mexico	1	–	8	3	–	8
Western New Mexico	0	–	9	2	–	9
$ – Conference champion; ^ – NCAA Division II playoff participant; # – Heritage Bowl participant * – Sul Ross ineligible for postseason play due to transition from NCAA Division III; Rankings from AFCA poll

2025 Lone Star Conference football standings
	Conf.			Overall
Team	W		L	W		L
No. 13 Central Washington $^	9	–	0	10	–	2
No. 5 UT Permian Basin ^	7	–	2	11	–	3
Western Oregon	7	–	2	8	–	3
West Texas A&M #	7	–	2	8	–	4
Angelo State	4	–	5	6	–	5
Texas A&M–Kingsville	4	–	5	5	–	6
Eastern New Mexico	3	–	6	3	–	8
Midwestern State	3	–	6	3	–	8
Western New Mexico	1	–	8	2	–	9
Sul Ross*	0	–	9	0	–	11
$ – Conference champion; ^ – NCAA Division II playoff participant; # – Heritage Bowl participant * – Sul Ross ineligible for postseason play due to transition from NCAA Division III; Rankings from AFCA Poll
