= 1984 East Texas State Lions football team =

American college football season

1984 East Texas State Lions football
- Conference: Lone Star Conference
- Record: 5–5 (1–3 LSC)
- Head coach: Ernest Hawkins (21st season)
- Offensive scheme: Option
- Defensive coordinator: Eddie Vowell (2nd season)
- Base defense: 4–3
- Home stadium: Memorial Stadium

1984 Lone Star Conference football standings
	Conf.					Overall
Team	W		L		T	W		L		T
No. 10 Angelo State $	4	–	0	–	0	8	–	3	–	0
Texas A&I	3	–	1	–	0	6	–	5	–	0
Abilene Christian	2	–	2	–	0	3	–	7	–	0
East Texas State	1	–	3	–	0	5	–	5	–	0
Howard Payne	0	–	4	–	0	1	–	8	–	1
$ – Conference champion; Rankings from NCAA Division II Football Committee poll

The 1984 East Texas State Lions football team represented East Texas State University—now known as Texas A&M University–Commerce—as a member of the Lone Star Conference (LSC) during the 1984 NCAA Division II football season. Led by 21st-year head coach Ernest Hawkins, the Lions compiled an overall record of 5–5 with a mark of 1–3 in conference play, placing fourth in the LSC. East Texas State played home games at Memorial Stadium in Commerce, Texas.

== Schedule ==
Date	Opponent	Site	Result	Attendance
September 9	at Cameron*	Cameron Stadium; Lawton, OK	L 22–33	5,000
September 15	Southern Arkansas*	Memorial Stadium; Commerce, TX	W 35–14	5,382
September 22	Northwestern State*	Memorial Stadium; Commerce, TX	W 48–20	6,514
October 6	at Central State (OK)*	Wantland Stadium; Edmond, OK	W 35–10	6,500
October 13	Sam Houston State*	Memorial Stadium; Commerce, TX	L 18–24	750
October 20	at Eastern New Mexico*	Greyhound Stadium; Portales, NM	W 40–30	2,600
October 27	at Texas A&I	Javelina Stadium; Kingsville, TX	L 23–29	7,200
November 3	Angelo State	Memorial Stadium; Commerce, TX	L 14–17	7,500
November 10	Howard Payne	Memorial Stadium; Commerce, TX	W 23–7	1,200
November 17	at Abilene Christian	Shotwell Stadium; Abilene, TX	L 14–24	750
*Non-conference game

== Postseason awards ==
=== All-Americans ===
- Alan Veingrad, First Team Offensive Tackle
- Donnie White, Second Team Linebacker

=== LSC First Team ===
- Javier Cardenas, Tight End
- Bubba Elmore, Defensive Back
- Wes Smith, Receiver
- Alan Veingrad, Offensive Tackle
- Donnie White, Linebacker
- Curtis Williams, Center

=== LSC Second Team ===
- Bruno Briones, Quarterback
- Mark Copeland, Linebacker
- Ricky Dirks, Tailback

=== LSC Honorable Mention ===
- Stan Haggerty, Fullback
- Larry Hamilton, Defensive Line
- Ralph Oberdieck, Offensive Tackle
- Mark Spencer, WR
