= 1985 East Texas State Lions football team =

American college football season

1985 East Texas State Lions football
- Conference: Lone Star Conference
- Record: 5–5 (2–3 LSC)
- Head coach: Ernest Hawkins (22nd season)
- Offensive scheme: Option
- Defensive coordinator: Eddie Vowell (3rd season)
- Base defense: 4–3
- Home stadium: Memorial Stadium

1985 Lone Star Conference football standings
	Conf.					Overall
Team	W		L		T	W		L		T
Texas A&I $	5	–	0	–	0	8	–	3	–	0
Angelo State	3	–	2	–	0	7	–	4	–	0
Eastern New Mexico	3	–	2	–	0	5	–	5	–	0
Abilene Christian	2	–	3	–	0	5	–	4	–	2
East Texas State	2	–	3	–	0	5	–	5	–	0
Howard Payne	0	–	5	–	0	2	–	6	–	2
$ – Conference champion

The 1985 East Texas State Lions football team represented East Texas State University—now known as Texas A&M University–Commerce—as a member of the Lone Star Conference (LSC) during the 1985 NCAA Division II football season. Led by Ernest Hawkins in his 22nd and final season as head coach, the Lions compiled an overall record of 5–5 with a mark of 2–3 in conference play, tying for fourth place in the LSC. East Texas State played home games at Memorial Stadium in Commerce, Texas.

== Schedule ==
Date	Opponent	Site	Result	Attendance	Source
September 14	Cameron*	Memorial Stadium; Commerce, TX	W 14–3	1,200	
September 21	at Southern Arkansas*	Wilkins Stadium; Magnolia, AR	L 20–30	4,500	
September 28	at Northwestern State*	Harry Turpin Stadium; Natchitoches, LA	W 34–24	5,000	
October 5	at Sam Houston State*	Pritchett Field; Huntsville, TX	W 40–21	5,500	
October 12	Central State (OK)*	Memorial Stadium; Commerce, TX	L 13–41	4,500	
October 26	Eastern New Mexico	Memorial Stadium; Commerce, TX	W 51–38		
November 2	Texas A&I	Memorial Stadium; Commerce, TX	L 19–22	2,500	
November 9	at Angelo State	San Angelo Stadium; San Angelo, TX	L 24–28	7,500	
November 16	at Howard Payne	Yellowjacket Stadium; Brownwood, TX	W 21–0		
November 23	Abilene Christian	Memorial Stadium; Commerce, TX	L 9–30	850	
*Non-conference game

== Postseason awards ==
=== LSC First Team ===
- Dexter Branch, Defensive Line
- Mark Copeland, Linebacker
- Wes Smith, Wide Receiver
- Vincent Stowers, Defensive Back
- Donnie White, Linebacker

=== LSC Second Team ===
- Robert Giddens, Tight End
- Frank Haggarty, Defensive Line
- Donald Lee, Running Back
- Nathan McClure, Offensive Tackle
- Lawrence Motten, Defensive Tackle
- Mike Trigg, Quarterback

=== LSC Honorable Mention ===
- Lynn Herrick, Offensive Tackle
- Robert Kubicek, Defensive Line
