= 1989 East Texas State Lions football team =

American college football season

1989 East Texas State Lions football
- Conference: Lone Star Conference
- Record: 4–6 (2–5 LSC)
- Head coach: Eddie Vowell (4th season)
- Home stadium: Memorial Stadium

1989 Lone Star Conference football standings
	Conf.					Overall
Team	W		L		T	W		L		T
No. 1 Texas A&I $^	7	–	0	–	0	10	–	1	–	0
No. T–5 Angelo State ^	5	–	2	–	0	11	–	3	–	0
Eastern New Mexico	5	–	2	–	0	7	–	3	–	0
Abilene Christian	5	–	2	–	0	5	–	5	–	0
East Texas State	2	–	5	–	0	4	–	6	–	0
Cameron	2	–	5	–	0	3	–	7	–	0
West Texas State	2	–	5	–	0	3	–	8	–	0
Central State (OK)	0	–	7	–	0	0	–	10	–	1
$ – Conference champion; ^ – NCAA Division II playoff participant; Rankings from NCAA Division II Football Committee poll

The 1989 East Texas State Lions football team represented East Texas State University—now known as Texas A&M University–Commerce—as a member of the Lone Star Conference (LSC) during the 1989 NCAA Division II football season. Led by fourth-year head coach Eddie Vowell, the Lions compiled an overall record of 4–6 with a mark of 2–5 in conference play, placing in a three-way tied for fifth in the LSC. The team played its home games at Memorial Stadium in Commerce, Texas.

== Schedule ==
Date	Opponent	Rank	Site	Result	Attendance	Source
September 2	vs. Livingston*	No. 18	Ernest F. Ladd Memorial Stadium; Mobile, AL	W 41–24	1,500	
September 9	at East Central*	No. 18	Norris Field; Ada, OK	W 42–10	1,500	
September 16	at No. T–6 (I-AA) Northwestern State*	No. 20	Harry Turpin Stadium; Natchitoches, LA	L 14–38	11,400	
September 30	Central State (OK)		Memorial Stadium; Commerce, TX	W 33–31	2,500	
October 7	at No. 2 Texas A&I		Javelina Stadium; Kingsville, TX	L 7–48	13,500	
October 14	West Texas State		Memorial Stadium; Commerce, TX	W 21–20	1,000	
October 21	at Eastern New Mexico		Greyhound Stadium; Portales, NM	L 28–45	500	
October 28	Abilene Christian		Memorial Stadium; Commerce, TX	L 21–24	5,500	
November 4	at No. T–5 Angelo State		San Angelo Stadium; San Angelo, TX	L 8–35	7,000	
November 11	Cameron		Memorial Stadium; Commerce, TX	L 32–35	1,200	
*Non-conference game; Rankings from NCAA Division II Football Committee Poll released prior to the game

== Postseason awards ==
=== All-Americans ===
- Terry Bagsby, Second Team Defensive End
- Gary Compton, Second Team Receiver

=== LSC First Team ===
- Terry Bagsby, Defensive Lineman

=== LSC Second Team ===
- Gary Compton, Wide Receiver
- Kit Morton, Defensive End
- John Varnell, Center

=== LSC Honorable Mention ===
- Johnie Hurndon, Running Back
- Shane Summers, Punter
