= 1986 East Texas State Lions football team =

American college football season

1986 East Texas State Lions football
- Conference: Lone Star Conference
- Record: 2–9 (1–5 LSC)
- Head coach: Eddie Vowell (1st season)
- Home stadium: Memorial Stadium

1986 Lone Star Conference football standings
	Conf.					Overall
Team	W		L		T	W		L		T
West Texas State $	6	–	0	–	0	7	–	4	–	0
No. 8 Texas A&I	4	–	2	–	0	9	–	2	–	0
No. T–10 Abilene Christian	4	–	2	–	0	7	–	3	–	0
Eastern New Mexico	3	–	3	–	0	8	–	3	–	0
Angelo State	3	–	3	–	0	6	–	5	–	0
East Texas State	1	–	5	–	0	2	–	9	–	0
Howard Payne	0	–	6	–	0	0	–	10	–	0
$ – Conference champion; Rankings from NCAA Division II Football Committee poll

The 1986 East Texas State Lions football team represented East Texas State University—now known as Texas A&M University–Commerce—as a member of the Lone Star Conference (LSC) during the 1986 NCAA Division II football season. Led by first-year head coach Eddie Vowell, the Lions compiled an overall record of 2–9 with a mark of 1–5 in conference play, placing sixth in the LSC. 1986 was only the second losing season for the program in 20 years. East Texas State played home games at Memorial Stadium in Commerce, Texas.

== Schedule ==
Date	Opponent	Site	Result	Attendance	Source
September 4	Livingston*	Memorial Stadium; Commerce, TX	W 9–2	5,000	
September 13	Southern Arkansas*	Memorial Stadium; Commerce, TX	L 10–21	2,173	
September 27	at No. 2 (I-AA) Arkansas State*	Indian Stadium; Jonesboro, AR	L 0–44	16,889	
October 4	at No. 9 (I-AA) Tennessee State*	Hale Stadium; Nashville, TN	L 6–15	5,500	
October 11	at Southwestern Oklahoma State*	Milam Stadium; Weatherford, OK	L 9–19	5,000	
October 18	No. 2 Texas A&I	Memorial Stadium; Commerce, TX	L 0–42	1,700	
October 25	at West Texas State	Kimbrough Memorial Stadium; Canyon, TX	L 19–49	5,415	
November 1	Eastern New Mexico	Memorial Stadium; Commerce, TX	L 6–21	5,000	
November 8	at No. T–8 Abilene Christian	Shotwell Stadium; Abilene, TX	L 12–20	7,500	
November 15	Angelo State	Memorial Stadium; Commerce, TX	L 16–43	1,850	
November 22	at Howard Payne	Yellowjacket Stadium; Brownwood, TX	W 42–16	1,500	
*Non-conference game; Rankings from NCAA Division II Football Committee Poll released prior to the game

== Postseason awards ==
=== All-Americans ===
- Mike Ciszewski, Honorable Mention Linebacker
- Lawrence Motton, Honorable Mention Defensive Lineman

=== LSC First Team ===
- Mike Ciszewski, LB (1986)
- Lawrence Motton, DL (1986)

=== LSC Second Team ===
- Mark Kerr, Defensive Lineman
- Aaron Muehlstein, Defensive Back
- Allen Roulette, Offensive Tackle
- Vincent Stowers, Defensive Back

=== LSC Honorable Mention ===
- Robert Giddens, Tight End
- Dexter Harvey, Defensive End
- Curtis Langston, Offensive Guard
- Dan Roberson, Punter
- Stacy Williams, Defensive Back
