= 1992 East Texas State Lions football team =

American college football season

1992 East Texas State Lions football
- Conference: Lone Star Conference
- Record: 8–3 (5–1 LSC)
- Head coach: Eddie Vowell (7th season)
- Defensive coordinator: Mark Copeland
- Home stadium: Memorial Stadium

1992 Lone Star Conference football standings
	Conf.					Overall
Team	W		L		T	W		L		T
No. 4 Texas A&I $^	6	–	0	–	0	9	–	3	–	0
No. 14 East Texas State	5	–	1	–	0	8	–	3	–	0
Angelo State	3	–	3	–	0	5	–	5	–	0
Eastern New Mexico	3	–	3	–	0	5	–	5	–	0
Central Oklahoma	2	–	4	–	0	6	–	4	–	0
Abilene Christian	2	–	5	–	0	3	–	6	–	0
Cameron	0	–	6	–	0	1	–	9	–	0
$ – Conference champion; ^ – NCAA Division II playoff participant; Rankings from NCAA Division II Football Committee poll

The 1992 East Texas State Lions football team represented East Texas State University—now known as Texas A&M University–Commerce—as a member of the Lone Star Conference (LSC) during the 1992 NCAA Division II football season. Led by seventh-year head coach Eddie Vowell, the Lions compiled an overall record of 8–3 with a mark of 5–1 in conference play, placing second in the LSC. East Texas State finished the season at No. 14 in the NCAA Division II rankings. The team played its home games at Memorial Stadium in Commerce, Texas. Senior defensive back Eric Turner was a nominee for the Harlon Hill Trophy.

== Schedule ==
Date	Opponent	Rank	Site	Result	Attendance	Source
September 5	at Central Arkansas*	No. 15	Estes Stadium; Conway, AR	W 30–18	5,361	
September 12	at No. 1 Pittsburg State*	No. 15	Carnie Smith Stadium; Pittsburg, KS	L 13–27	7,000	
September 19	Southern Arkansas*		Memorial Stadium; Commerce, TX	W 31–6	6,500	
September 26	at Northwestern State*	No. 17	Harry Turpin Stadium; Natchitoches, LA	L 0–20	10,200	
October 5	at Central Oklahoma		Wantland Stadium; Edmond, OK	W 26–9	4,108	
October 12	at No. 4 Texas A&I	No. 15	Memorial Stadium; Commerce, TX (Chennault Cup)	L 10–17	5,000	
October 19	Iowa Wesleyan	No. 18	Memorial Stadium; Commerce, TX	W 57–7	3,000	
October 24	Eastern New Mexico	No. 14т	Memorial Stadium; Commerce, TX	W 30–21	7,000	
October 31	at Abilene Christian	No. 18	Shotwell Stadium; Abilene, TX	W 37–3	6,000	
November 7	Angelo State	No. 14	Memorial Stadium; Commerce, TX	W 25–11	5,000	
November 14	at Cameron	No. 14	Cameron Stadium; Lawton, OK	W 40–3	1,013	
*Non-conference game; Rankings from NCAA Division II Football Committee Poll released prior to the game

== Postseason awards ==
=== Harlon Hill Trophy nominee ===
- Eric Turner, Defensive Back, Senior

=== All-Americans ===
- Eric Turner, Defensive Back, First Team
- Fred Woods, Linebacker, First Team
- Billy Watkins, Placekicker, First Team
- Pat Williams, Defensive Back, First Team
- Curtis Buckley, Strong Safety, Second Team
- Anthony Brooks, Wide Receiver, Third Team
- Earl Bell, Offensive Tackle, Honorable Mention
- Duane Hicks, Defensive Tackle, Honorable Mention

=== LSC superlatives ===
- Offensive Player of the Year: Anthony Brooks
- Defensive Player of the Year: Eric Turner

=== LSC First Team ===
- Earl Bell, Offensive Tackle
- Anthony Brooks, Wide Receiver
- Curtis Buckley, Strong Safety
- Duane Hicks, Defensive Tackle
- Michael Hightower, Running Back
- Billy Minor, Wide Receiver
- Eric Turner, Cornerback
- Billy Watkins, Kicker
- Pat Williams, Defensive Back
- Fred Woods, Linebacker

=== LSC Second Team ===
- Clint Dolezel, Quarterback
- Cubby Gillingwater, Punter
- Eric Herrick, Offensive Guard
- Jarobi Nelson, Defensive Line
- Terrance Toliver, Linebacker

=== LSC Honorable Mention ===
- Jeremy Griffin, Running Back
- Mark Jones, Safety
- Steve Malin, Offensive Tackle
