= 1993 East Texas State Lions football team =

American college football season

1993 East Texas State Lions football
- Conference: Lone Star Conference
- Record: 5–6 (1–4 LSC)
- Head coach: Eddie Vowell (8th season)
- Home stadium: Memorial Stadium

1993 Lone Star Conference football standings
	Conf.					Overall
Team	W		L		T	W		L		T
No. 19 Texas A&M–Kingsville $^	5	–	0	–	0	7	–	6	–	0
Abilene Christian	3	–	2	–	0	7	–	3	–	0
Angelo State	3	–	2	–	0	7	–	3	–	0
Central Oklahoma	2	–	3	–	0	7	–	3	–	0
East Texas State	1	–	4	–	0	5	–	6	–	0
Eastern New Mexico	1	–	4	–	0	1	–	8	–	1
$ – Conference champion; ^ – NCAA Division II playoff participant; Rankings from NCAA Division II Football Committee poll

The 1993 East Texas State Lions football team represented East Texas State University—now known as Texas A&M University–Commerce—as a member of the Lone Star Conference (LSC) during the 1993 NCAA Division II football season. Led by eighth-year head coach Eddie Vowell, the Lions compiled an overall record of 5–6 with a mark of 1–4 in conference play, tying for fifth place in the LSC. The team played its home games at Memorial Stadium in Commerce, Texas.

== Schedule ==
Date	Opponent	Rank	Site	Result	Attendance	Source
September 4	Central Arkansas*	No. 6	Memorial Stadium; Commerce, TX	W 16–13	4,500	
September 11	at Northwest Missouri State*	No. 6	Rickenbrode Stadium; Maryville, MO	W 45–11	4,500	
September 18	at Henderson State*	No. 5т	Carpenter–Haygood Stadium; Arkadelphia, AR	L 0–7	3,212	
September 25	at Northwestern State*	No. 18т	Harry Turpin Stadium; Natchitoches, LA	L 19–30	9,200	
October 2	No. 10 Central Oklahoma	No. 20	Memorial Stadium; Commerce, TX	W 30–27	6,100	
October 9	at Texas A&M–Kingsville	No. 12	Javelina Stadium; Kingsville, TX (Chennault Cup)	L 3–28	5,100	
October 16	Delta State*		Memorial Stadium; Commerce, TX	W 19–14	3,500	
October 23	at Eastern New Mexico		Greyhound Stadium; Portales, NM	L 0–15	600	
October 30	No. 20т Abilene Christian		Memorial Stadium; Commerce, TX	L 10–17	2,000	
November 6	at No. 13 Angelo State		San Angelo Stadium; San Angelo, TX	L 8–31	7,600	
November 13	Texas Southern*		Memorial Stadium; Commerce, TX	W 16–7	600	
*Non-conference game; Rankings from NCAA Division II Football Committee Poll released prior to the game

== Postseason awards ==
=== All-Americans ===
- Fred Woods, Linebacker, First Team (Consensus)
- Billy Watkins, Placekicker, First Team
- Duane Hicks, Defensive Tackle, Third Team
- Kevin Mathis, Cornerback, Honorable Mention

Cubby Gillingwater, Punter, Honorable Mention

=== LSC First Team ===
- Eric Herrick, Offensive Guard
- Duane Hicks, Defensive Tackle
- Fred Woods, Linebacker

=== LSC Second Team ===
- Clint Dolezel, Quarterback
- Cubby Gillingwater, Punter
- Brian Jones, Offensive Tackle
- Kevin Mathis, Cornerback
- Billy Watkins, Kicker
- Donald Wesley, Wide Receiver

=== LSC Honorable Mention ===
- Marcus Gates, Defensive Back
- Michael Hightower, Running Back
- Clarence Nobles, Linebacker
