= 1988 East Texas State Lions football team =

American college football season

1988 East Texas State Lions football
- Conference: Lone Star Conference
- Record: 8–3 (5–2 LSC)
- Head coach: Eddie Vowell (3rd season)
- Home stadium: Memorial Stadium

1988 Lone Star Conference football standings
	Conf.					Overall
Team	W		L		T	W		L		T
No. 3 Texas A&I $^	6	–	1	–	0	10	–	3	–	0
No. 15 East Texas State	5	–	2	–	0	8	–	3	–	0
Angelo State	5	–	2	–	0	6	–	4	–	0
No. 18 Cameron	4	–	3	–	0	5	–	3	–	1
Central State (OK)	4	–	3	–	0	4	–	5	–	0
Abilene Christian	3	–	4	–	0	3	–	7	–	0
West Texas State	1	–	6	–	0	2	–	8	–	0
Eastern New Mexico	0	–	6	–	0	2	–	8	–	0
$ – Conference champion; ^ – NCAA Division II playoff participant; Rankings from NCAA Division II Football Committee poll for Texas A&I and East Texas State and NAIA Division I poll for Cameron

The 1988 East Texas State Lions football team represented East Texas State University—now known as Texas A&M University–Commerce—as a member of the Lone Star Conference (LSC) during the 1988 NCAA Division II football season. Led by third-year head coach Eddie Vowell, the Lions compiled an overall record of 8–3 with a mark of 5–2 in conference play, trying for second place in the LSC. East Texas State began the season at 8–1 and reached as high as No. 2 in the NCAA Division II rankings before losing their final two games. It was Vowell's first winning season as head coach and the program's the first winning season since 1983. The team played its home games at Memorial Stadium in Commerce, Texas.

== Schedule ==
Date	Opponent	Rank	Site	Result	Attendance	Source
September 3	at Livingston*		Tiger Stadium; Livingston, AL	W 25–14	3,500	
September 10	East Central*		Memorial Stadium; Commerce, TX	W 22–19	1,200	
September 17	Southern Arkansas*		Memorial Stadium; Commerce, TX	W 17–11	2,200	
September 24	at Northwestern State*	No. 10	Harry Turpin Stadium; Natchitoches, LA	L 13–41	8,200	
October 1	at Central State (OK)	No. 16	Wantland Stadium; Edmond, OK	W 35–21	1,737	
October 8	No. 5 Texas A&I	No. 10	Memorial Stadium; Commerce, TX	W 42–35	4,000	
October 15	at West Texas State	No. 5	Kimbrough Memorial Stadium; Canyon, TX	W 41–37	6,437	
October 22	Eastern New Mexico	No. 2	Memorial Stadium; Commerce, TX	W 28–13	8,000	
October 29	at Abilene Christian	No. 2	Shotwell Stadium; Abilene, TX	W 39–24	10,000	
November 5	at Angelo State	No. 2	San Angelo Stadium; San Angelo, TX	L 23–56	3,000	
November 12	Cameron	No. 15	Memorial Stadium; Commerce, TX	L 6–42	5,000	
*Non-conference game; Rankings from NCAA Division II Football Committee Poll released prior to the game

== Postseason awards ==
=== All-Americans ===
- Kit Morton, First Team Defensive End
- Gary Compton, Honorable Mention Receiver

=== LSC First Team ===
- Mike Ciszewski, Linebacker
- Gary Compton, Tight End/Receiver
- Kerry Shelton, Free Safety

=== LSC Second Team ===
- Jeff Dotie, Receiver
- Kit Morton, Defensive End
- Jarrod Owens, Running Back
- Allen Roulette, Offensive Tackle
- Steve Sellers, Offensive Lineman
- Mike Trigg, Quarterback

=== LSC Honorable Mention ===
- Gary DeVaughn, Defensive Line
- Kevin Hedges, Offensive Tackle
- Lee Hucklebridge, Defensive Line
- Jeff Manuel, Safety
- Aaron Muehlstein, Defensive Back
- Ronnie Prater, Wide Receiver
- Shane Summers, Punter
- John Varnell, Center
