= 1996 Texas A&M–Commerce Lions football team =

American college football season

1996 Texas A&M–Commerce Lions football
- Conference: Lone Star Conference
- Record: 7–4 (4–3 LSC)
- Head coach: Eddie Vowell (11th season)
- Defensive coordinator: Mark Copeland
- Home stadium: Memorial Stadium

1996 Lone Star Conference football standings
	Conf.			Overall
Team	W		L	W		L
No. 1 Texas A&M–Kingsville $^	7	–	0	8	–	3
No. 9 Central Oklahoma ^	5	–	2	9	–	3
Texas A&M–Commerce	4	–	3	7	–	3
Angelo State	4	–	3	6	–	4
Abilene Christian	4	–	3	6	–	4
Tarleton State	2	–	5	5	–	5
Eastern New Mexico	2	–	5	3	–	8
West Texas A&M	0	–	7	1	–	9
$ – Conference champion; ^ – NCAA Division II playoff participant; Rankings from NCAA Division II Football Committee poll

The 1996 Texas A&M–Commerce Lions football team represented Texas A&M University–Commerce—as a member of the Lone Star Conference (LSC) during the 1996 NCAA Division II football season. Led by 11th-year head coach Eddie Vowell, the Lions compiled an overall record of 7–4 with a mark of 4–3 in conference play, placing in a three-way tie for third in the LSC. The team played its home games at Memorial Stadium in Commerce, Texas. Texas A&M University–Commerce was renamed from East Texas State University after joining the Texas A&M University System in 1996.

== Schedule ==
Date	Opponent	Rank	Site	Result	Attendance	Source
September 7	Harding*	No. 11	Memorial Stadium; Commerce, TX	W 43–28	7,325	
September 14	Henderson State*	No. 4	Memorial Stadium; Commerce, TX	W 19–14	2,011	
September 21	at Northwestern State*	No. 4	Harry Turpin Stadium; Natchitoches, LA	L 7–33	11,256	
September 28	at Arkansas–Pine Bluff*	No. 8	Golden Lion Stadium; Pine Bluff, AR	W 20–7	6,500	
October 5	at No. 3 Central Oklahoma	No. 6	Wantland Stadium; Edmond, OK	L 21–38	1,700	
October 12	No. 8 Texas A&M–Kingsville		Memorial Stadium; Commerce, TX (Chennault Cup)	L 28–41	8,036	
October 19	at West Texas A&M		Kimbrough Memorial Stadium; Canyon, TX (East Texas vs. West Texas)	W 31–0	3,150	
October 26	Eastern New Mexico		Memorial Stadium; Commerce, TX	W 42–10	4,674	
November 2	Abilene Christian		Shotwell Stadium; Abilene, TX	W 17–0	2,000	
November 9	Angelo State*	No. 16	Memorial Stadium; Commerce, TX	L 32–35	3,450	
November 16	at Tarleton State		Memorial Stadium; Stephenville, TX (President's Cup)	W 56–17	1,500	
*Non-conference game; Rankings from NCAA Division II Football Committee Poll released prior to the game

== Postseason awards ==
=== All-Americans ===
- Kevin Mathis, First Team
- James Epps, Third Team
- Brett Bertrand, Honorable Mention

=== LSC Superlatives ===
- Defensive Back of the Year: Kevin Mathis

=== LSC First Team ===
- Ralph Bennett, Offensive Tackle
- Brett Bertrand, Defensive End
- Cole Cayce, Quarterback
- David Dell, Kicker
- James Epps, Receiver
- Kevin Mathis, Cornerback
- Jim Suiter, Offensive Tackle

=== LSC Second Team ===
- Travis Marshall, Defensive End

=== LSC Honorable Mention ===
- Trey Burk, Offensive Guard
- Casey Cowan, Wide Receiver
- Jason Hoffman, Center
- Jermaine McDowell, Running Back
- Neal Searcy, Defensive Back
- Carl Wheeler, Defensive Back
