= Will Cureton =

American football player (born 1950)

No. 16
- Position: Quarterback

Personal information
- Born: December 2, 1950 (age 75); Bexar County, Texas, U.S.
- Listed height: 6 ft 3 in (1.91 m)
- Listed weight: 200 lb (91 kg)

Career information
- High school: Whitewright (TX)
- College: East Texas State
- NFL draft: 1974: undrafted

Career history
- Cleveland Browns (1974–1975)

Awards and highlights
- As player: NAIA Division I national champion (1972); First-team All-LSC (1972); Texas A&M-Commerce Athletic Hall of Fame (1993)

Career NFL statistics
- Passing attempts: 32
- Passing completions: 10
- Completion percentage: 31.3%
- TD–INT: 1–1
- Passing yards: 95
- Passer rating: 38
- Stats at Pro Football Reference

William Joe Cureton (born December 2, 1950) is an American former professional football player who was a quarterback for two seasons with the Cleveland Browns of the National Football League (NFL). He played college football for the East Texas State Lions (now East Texas A&M), starting at quarterback for the Lions 1972 national championship team.

== Early life ==
Cureton was born in Meridian, Texas, to Joe and Lauriece Cureton. His family then moved to the North Texas town of Whitewright, Texas, where he was a standout quarterback at Whitewright High School. In his 3 seasons as a starter, he established himself as one of the area's top passers and led his teams to a combined 16-3-1 record, averaging nearly 30 points per game in each season from 1967 to 1968 for Coach Clyde McMurray. He was offered an athletic scholarship to play Football by East Texas State University coach Ernest Hawkins. Cureton graduated from Whitewright High School in 1969.

== College career ==
Cureton joined the East Texas State Lion football team but was a member of the Lion scout team as a redshirt freshman in 1969. The 1969 Lions won the Lone Star Conference championship. In 1970, he was the back-up quarterback to All-Conference and future Philadelphia Eagle Jim Dietz. Cureton played in all 11 games during the 1970 season in relief of Dietz, completing 6 of 15 pass attempts for 63 yards. The 1970 Lions finished 5–6.

Heading into his second year on the team, Cureton earned the starting job for the 1971 season, but only played 7 games due to injury. Despite this, the Lions returning to a winning season with a 6–5 record his Sophomore campaign. Cureton completed 75 passes out of 139 attempts for 997 yards, averaging 142 passing yards per game and also threw for 5 touchdown passes.

During the 1972 season, Cureton led the 1972 Lions to a historic season in which he threw for 1,529 yards and 8 touchdowns, completing 112 pass attempts in the process. The Lions went 8-2 during the regular season, losing only one NAIA game and defeating 3 ranked opponents and winning the 1972 LSC title with a 7-1 league record. The Lions were selected as the 4th team in the NAIA Division I playoffs. In the first round against # 1 ranked Central Oklahoma, Cureton threw a 7-yard touchdown pass and the Lions tallied 519 yards of total offense as they defeated the top ranked Bronchos, 54–0. In the NAIA National Title game that was played in Commerce, Cureton scored a 1-yard touchdown in the 3rd quarter to give the Lions the lead. They defeated Carson-Newman 21-18 for their first national championship, finishing the season 10–2. Cureton was named First Team All Conference, Honorable Mention All-Texas by the UPI, and an academic All-American by CoSIDA and Academic All-Conference.

Cureton's final year, he guided the Lions to a 7–4 record, finishing 3rd in the Lone Star Conference. He had another stellar individual season, throwing for 905 yards and 3 touchdown passes despite missing a game due to injury. His final career numbers were 253 completions out of 547 attempts, 3,494 passing yards and 16 passing touchdowns. He also scored 4 rushing touchdowns. As a student at ETSU, he was President of the Gamma Upsilon chapter of the Kappa Alpha Order, and majored in Accounting, graduating in 1973 with a bachelor's degree in accounting from the ETSU Business School.

== Professional career ==
Cureton was not drafted during the 1974 NFL draft, but was signed as a free agent by the Cleveland Browns and made the team after a successful training camp in 1974. He played for two seasons for the Browns. He was mainly a reserve in the NFL and was a starter briefly during the 1975 season. He left the NFL to pursue a career in accounting after the 1975 season. During those two seasons he completed 10 of 32 passes for 95 yards, one touchdown, and one interception.
