= 1987 East Texas State Lions football team =

American college football season

1987 East Texas State Lions football
- Conference: Lone Star Conference
- Record: 2–9 (0–5 LSC)
- Head coach: Eddie Vowell (2nd season)
- Home stadium: Memorial Stadium

1987 Lone Star Conference football standings
| | Conf. | | | | | Overall |
| Team | W | | L | | T | W | | L | | T |
|---|---|---|---|---|---|---|---|---|---|---|
| No. 1 Texas A&I + | 4 | – | 1 | – | 0 | 9 | – | 2 | – | 0 |
| No. 9 Angelo State +^ | 4 | – | 1 | – | 0 | 8 | – | 3 | – | 0 |
| No. 13 Eastern New Mexico | 3 | – | 2 | – | 0 | 9 | – | 2 | – | 0 |
| Abilene Christian | 2 | – | 3 | – | 0 | 5 | – | 6 | – | 0 |
| West Texas State | 2 | – | 3 | – | 0 | 5 | – | 6 | – | 0 |
| East Texas State | 0 | – | 5 | – | 0 | 2 | – | 9 | – | 0 |
+ – Conference co-champions; ^ – NCAA Division II playoff participant; Rankings from NCAA Division II Football Committee poll

The 1987 East Texas State Lions football team represented East Texas State University—now known as Texas A&M University–Commerce—as a member of the Lone Star Conference (LSC) during the 1987 NCAA Division II football season. Led by second-year head coach Eddie Vowell, the Lions compiled an overall record of 2–9 with a mark of 0–5 in conference play, placing last out of six teams in the LSC. For the first time in program history, the East Texas State went winless in conference play. The team played its home games at Memorial Stadium in Commerce, Texas.

== Schedule ==
| Date | Opponent | Site | Result | Attendance | Source |
|---|---|---|---|---|---|
| September 3 | Livingston* | Memorial Stadium; Commerce, TX | L 0–8 | 2,500 | |
| September 12 | at East Central* | Norris Field; Ada, OK | L 20–51 | 2,800 | |
| September 19 | at Southern Arkansas* | Wilkins Stadium; Magnolia, AR | L 17–21 | 3,300 | |
| September 26 | at Arkansas State* | Indian Stadium; Jonesboro, AR | L 22–77 | 12,330 | |
| October 3 | Southwestern Oklahoma State* | Memorial Stadium; Commerce, TX | W 28–14 | 1,500 | |
| October 17 | at No. 3 Texas A&I | Javelina Stadium; Kingsville, TX | L 6–42 | 12,200 | |
| October 24 | West Texas State | Memorial Stadium; Commerce, TX | L 34–35 | 1,500 | |
| October 31 | at No. 5 Eastern New Mexico | Greyhound Stadium; Portales, NM | L 12–34 | | |
| November 7 | Abilene Christian | Memorial Stadium; Commerce, TX | L 19–38 | 5,000 | |
| November 14 | at No. 13 Angelo State | San Angelo Stadium; San Angelo, TX | L 8–49 | 3,100 | |
| November 21 | Central State (OK)* | Memorial Stadium; Commerce, TX | W 43–22 | 350 | |
*Non-conference game; Rankings from NCAA Division II Football Committee Poll released prior to the game

== Postseason awards ==
=== LSC First Team ===
- Winfred Essix, Wide Receiver

=== LSC Second Team ===
- Kevin Hedges, Offensive Tackle
- Aaron Muehlstein, Defensive Back
- Jarrod Owens, Running Back

=== LSC Honorable Mention ===
- Gary Compton, Tight End
- Gary DeVaughn, Defensive Line
- Darryl Duffie, Defensive Line
- Joseph Hopkins, Wide Receiver
- Kyle Paschal, Offensive Guard
- Allen Roulette, Offensive Tackle
- Royce Slechta, Quarterback
