= Ernest Hawkins (coach) =

American football coach

Biographical details
- Born: January 23, 1927; Lamesa, Texas, U.S.
- Died: January 28, 2018 (aged 91); Greenville, Texas, U.S.
- Education: Texas Tech (B.A, 1950); East Texas State (M.S., 1957)

Playing career

Football
- 1947–1949: Texas Tech
- Position: Quarterback

Coaching career (HC unless noted)

Football
- 1950–1951: Paris (backfield)
- 1952–1956: Paris
- 1957–1963: East Texas State (AHC)
- 1964–1985: East Texas State

Basketball
- 1950–1957: Paris

Administrative career (AD unless noted)
- ?–1957: Paris

Head coaching record
- Overall: 132–92–6 (college football); 28–20–1 (junior college football)
- Bowls: 0–0–1 (college)
- Tournaments: Football; 3–1 (NAIA D-I playoffs)

Accomplishments and honors

Championships
- Football; 1 NAIA Division I National (1972); 4 LSC (1966, 1969, 1972, 1983); 2 TJCC (1954–1955)

Awards
- Football; 4× LSC Coach of the Year (1966, 1969, 1972, 1983)

Ernest Ray Hawkins (January 23, 1927 – January 28, 2018) was an American football coach, basketball coach, and athletic director. He served as head football coach at East Texas State University—now known as East Texas A&M University—from 1964 to 1985, compiling a 132–92–6 record. He is the winningest head coach in East Texas A&M Lions football history and led the program to the NAIA Football National Championship in 1972.

== Early life ==
Hawkins was born and raised in the West Texas town of Lamesa, Texas and was a standout in football, basketball, and track and field at Lamesa High School.

== Texas Tech ==
After graduating High School in 1944 he enrolled at Texas Tech University. After enrolling, Hawkins joined the military and did not participate in athletics due to World War II. When the war ended, Hawkins returned to school in Lubbock where wartime rules allowed him to compete. A multi-sport athlete, he was a standout on the Tech basketball and track teams, and was the quarterback for the Texas Tech football team from 1947 to 1949. In three seasons as the Red Raiders starting quarterback, he led the Red Raiders to three Border Conference championships and appearances in the Raisin Bowl and Sun Bowl, and was all-conference in the 1948 season. Hawkins graduated from Texas Tech in 1950 at the top of his graduating class.

== Paris Junior College ==
Hawkins and his wife Margaret moved from West Texas to Northeast Texas after he was given the job of head football coach and head basketball coach at Paris Junior College (PJC ) in Paris, Texas. Hawkins compiled a 32–20–1 record as the head football coach and a 39–49 record in basketball. He was also named to the office of athletic director for PJC due to his success on the court and on the field and administrative abilities. While at PJC, Hawkins attended graduate school at East Texas State University (ETSU) in Commerce, Texas, 40 miles southwest of Paris where he graduated from ETSU with a master's degree in 1956.

== East Texas State ==
In 1957 Hawkins was hired by Jules V. Sikes as assistant head football coach at East Texas State. Hawkins was part of an assistant staff that helped Sikes lead the Lions to six winning seasons, three Lone Star Conference championships, two LSC second-place finishes, and the Tangerine Bowl victories in 1957 and 1958. Hawkins worked with Sikes to make the Lion offense incredibly potent by mixing in Sikes' T formation power running with Hawkins's penchant for throwing the Football. The combination gave the Lions great success during that time, winning conference and bowl championships and sending numerous players to the National Football League.

In the Spring of 1964, Sikes died suddenly, and Hawkins was named successor shortly thereafter. The first two seasons saw the Lions go 2–7 and 4–5, but in only his third year Hawkins and Lions won the 1966 Lone Star Conference championship, his first of four. The Lions repeated as conference champions in 1969 and finished second place in 1968. At the end of the 1971 season, Hawkins had notched a record of 40–37–1 with two conference titles, one second-place finish, and four winning seasons.

=== 1972 season ===
Heading into the 1972 season, the Lions were picked to finish fourth in the conference, and started out the season with 14–12 loss to rival Abilene Christian University, but then racked up six straight wins to climb into the national polls in the top 5, but then The Lions were upset by Sul Ross State University by a 15–14 score, dropping them out of the top five ranking. The Lions finished the season with wins over Angelo State and Tarleton State. When the final national rankings came out, the Lions were ranked fourth in the nation and invited to the NAIA National Playoffs. In the first round the Lions faced the top-ranked team in the nation, the University of Central Oklahoma Bronchos. The Lions shocked the nation and routed UCO 54–0 in the national semi-finalists, earning them a spot in the National Championship game against the second ranked Carson-Newman College Eagles. The Championship game was determined to be played in Commerce. On a bitterly cold December day in front of a packed Memorial Stadium, Hawkins's Lions defeated Carson-Newman 21–18 to claim the national title. Among the players on the team were future NFL players Will Cureton, Harvey Martin, Autry Beamon, Aundra Thompson, and Tim Collier. The Lions were named the National Team of the Year and Hawkins was named both Lone Star Conference Coach of the Year and National Coach of the Year.

=== 1973–1985 ===
After winning the National Championship, Hawkins continued to have success and made East Texas State a contender in the Lone Star Conference. He had six seasons of seven wins or more, and went back to the post season in 1974 against Bethune-Cookman in the Florida Central Classic Bowl, resulting in a 7–7 tie. Hawkins and the Lions made another serious run at a national title by winning a Division Championship and going to the NAIA National Semi-finals, bowing out to Elon College, the eventual national champion that year. The Lions won the conference championship for the final time under Hawkins tenure in 1983. Hawkins announced his retirement prior to the 1985 season, stating he would be stepping down at the end of the season. Hawkins ended his career with a third-place finish in the 1985 season. During the 1973–1985 time frame, Hawkins also coached future professionals Michael Trigg, Wade Wilson, Wes Smith, Kyle Mackey, and Alan Veingrad. As head coach Hawkins won 132 games with 4 conference championships, three second-place finishes, one division championship, and coached the Texas team for the 1965 Oil Bowl.

=== Notable players coached ===
Hawkins coached a notable number of future professional football players during his time in Commerce.

- Harvey Martin-Dallas Cowboys, Super Bowl XII MVP, 4 Time All-Pro.
- Dwight White-Pittsburgh Steelers, All Pro, Steelers All-Time Team.
- Wade Wilson-All Pro QB for the Minnesota Vikings, New Orleans Saints, and Dallas Cowboys, Super Bowl Champion.
- Kyle Mackey-Starting Quarterback for the New York Jets and Miami Dolphins.
- Will Cureton-Starting Quarterback for the Cleveland Browns.
- Autry Beamon-Cornerback for the Minnesota Vikings.
- Tim Collier-Kansas City Chiefs
- Aundra Thompson-Green Bay Packers
- Sam Walton-New York Jets
- Wes Smith-Green Bay Packers
- Mike Trigg-Minnesota Vikings and also in the Arena Football League.
- Jim Thrower-Detroit Lions and Philadelphia Eagles
- Curtis Wester-Cleveland Browns, BC Lions (Canadian Football League).
- Alan Veingrad-Dallas Cowboys, Green Bay Packers, Super Bowl Champion.
- Rich Houston-New York Giants

== Personal life ==
Hawkins lived in Commerce, Texas, and was active with the football program at A&M–Commerce and also in the Commerce community. His wife, Margaret, died in 2012 after more than 62 years of marriage. The couple had two daughters, Kathy and Lu Anne, and one son, Ray. Hawkins had a health scare in mid-2012 and was hospitalized while contracting West Nile virus, but he was treated and released a week later. Hawkins was often seen attending TAMUC football games and practices and enjoyed fishing, and was a long time member of the First Baptist Church of Commerce. The Field at Memorial Stadium in Commerce was named Ernest Hawkins Field at Memorial Stadium in 2017 in his honor. Hawkins died on January 28, 2018, in Greenville, Texas, after a brief illness.

== Honors ==
- National Coach of the Year (1972)
- National Champion (1972)
- National Semifinalist (1980)
- 4 Time Lone Star Conference Coach of the Year (1966,1969,1972,1983)
- Texas Tech University Athletic Hall of Honor (1975)
- Texas A&M University Commerce Athletic Hall of Fame (1988)
- Lone Star Conference Athletic Hall of Fame (2004)

== Head coaching record ==
=== College football ===
Year	Team	Overall	Conference	Standing	Bowl/playoffs
East Texas State Lions (Lone Star Conference) (1964–1985)
1964	East Texas State	2–7	1–5	5th	
1965	East Texas State	4–5	2–4	5th	
1966	East Texas State	5–3–2	4–1–2	1st	
1967	East Texas State	4–6	3–4	T–5th	
1968	East Texas State	7–2–1	5–1	2nd	
1969	East Texas State	7–3	6–1	T–1st	
1970	East Texas State	5–6	4–5	5th	
1971	East Texas State	6–5	5–4	5th	
1972	East Texas State	10–2	7–1	1st	W NAIA Division I Championship
1973	East Texas State	7–4	6–3	3rd	
1974	East Texas State	7–4–1	5–4	5th	T Central Florida Classic Bowl
1975	East Texas State	8–3	6–3	4th	
1976	East Texas State	5–3–1	4–3	3rd	
1977	East Texas State	7–4	4–3	5th	
1978	East Texas State	4–7	2–5	7th	
1979	East Texas State	5–5	5–2	2nd	
1980	East Texas State	8–3–1	4–2–1	4th	L NAIA Division I Semifinal
1981	East Texas State	7–4	4–3	5th	
1982	East Texas State	6–4	4–3	2nd	
1983	East Texas State	8–2	6–1	T–1st	
1984	East Texas State	5–5	1–3	4th	
1985	East Texas State	5–5	2–3	T–3rd	
East Texas State:		132–92–6	89–74–2		
Total:		132–92–6			
National championship Conference title Conference division title or championship game berth

=== Junior college football ===
Year	Team	Overall	Conference	Standing	Bowl/playoffs
Paris Dragons (Big Six Junior College Conference) (1952–1953)
1952	Paris	4–6	2–2	3rd	
1953	Paris	6–3	1–1	2nd	
Paris Dragons (Texas Junior College Conference) (1954–1956)
1954	Paris	7–3	5–0	1st	
1955	Paris	5–5	5–1	T–1st	
1955	Paris	6–3–1	4–1	2nd	
Paris:		28–20–1	17–5		
Total:		28–20–1			
National championship Conference title Conference division title or championship game berth
