= Eddie Vowell =

American football coach

Biographical details
- Born: December 13, 1946

Coaching career (HC unless noted)
- 1979: Gainesville HS (TX)
- 1983–1985: East Texas State (DC)
- 1986–1998: East Texas State / Texas A&M–Commerce
- 1999–2002: Tampa Bay Storm (assistant)
- 2003: Grand Rapids Rampage (assistant)
- 2004–2006: Austin Wranglers (FB/LB)
- 2007–2008: Tampa Bay Storm (FB/LB)

Head coaching record
- Overall: 73–72–1 (college)
- Tournaments: 2–3 (NCAA D-II playoffs)

Accomplishments and honors

Championships
- 1 LSC (1990)

Awards
- 2× LSC Coach of the Year (1988, 1990)

Eddie Ray Vowell (born December 13, 1946) is a retired American football coach. He is best known for serving as head football coach at Texas A&M University–Commerce—now known as East Texas A&M University—from 1986 to 1998. He is second in program history with 73 career wins and led the Lions to the 1990 Lone Star Conference championship and appearances in the NCAA Division II playoffs in 1990, 1991, and 1995.

== Early life ==
Vowell was born in Oklahoma but was raised in the small Texas Panhandle community of Mobeetie. He graduated from Mobeetie High School in 1965 then attended Southwestern Oklahoma State University in Weatherford, Oklahoma, graduating with a bachelor's degree in 1969 and a master's degree in 1978. While at Southwestern Oklahoma State, he was a member of the Bulldogs track team and was also on the dean's list.

== Coaching career ==
=== Early coaching ===
After graduating, Vowell coached at several high schools in Texas. He coached David Bailiff while in San Antonio and coached at Gainesville High School in Gainesville, Texas before joining the staff at East Texas State.

=== East Texas State ===
Vowell was hired by Ernest Hawkins in 1983 as East Texas State's defensive coordinator and track and field coach. He helped lead the Lions to a share of the 1983 Lone Star Conference title.

In 1985, Hawkins announced his retirement from coaching and transitioned to athletic administration at East Texas State. Vowell was hired as head football coach. In Vowell's first two seasons, the Lions struggled, posting 2–9 records in 1986 and 1987, but the 1988 Lion team finished with an 8–3 record and reached as high as #2 in the national polls before dropping their two final games to lose out on a conference title and playoff bid. Nonetheless, he was named conference Coach of The Year. The Lions regressed to 4–6 in 1989, but then posted a 10–3 season in 1990 and won the Lone Star Conference with a perfect 7–0 record. They qualified for the national playoffs in 1990, losing in the National Quarterfinals, of which Vowell was once again named Coach of the Year in the Lone Star Conference. In 1991, the Lions finished second in LSC and returned to the playoffs, finishing as national quarterfinalists again and posting an 8–3 record in 1992. After two .500 seasons, the 1995 Lions returned to the playoffs, finishing 11th in the country. Vowell retired at the end of the 1998 season.

=== Arena Football League ===
Vowell was an assistant coach for the Tampa Bay Storm of the Arena Football League from 1998 to 2002 and again from 2007 to 2008. He also coached the Austin Wranglers as an assistant.

== Notable players coached ==
- Bobby Bounds, starting quarterback for the AFL's Cleveland Thunderbolts
- Gary Compton, wide receiver in the NFL, WLF, and AFL
- Mike Trigg, quarterback and coach in the Arena Football League
- Clint Dolezel, Hall of Fame Arena League quarterback and current coach of the Philadelphia Soul
- Curtis Buckley, NFL's Tampa Bay Buccaneers and San Francisco 49ers.
- Kevin Mathis, NFL's Dallas Cowboys and Atlanta Falcons
- Antonio Wilson, NFL's Minnesota Vikings and the CFL's Edmontons Eskimos
- Cedric Bonner, NFL's Atlanta Falcons and Washington Redskins
- Bo Kelly, fullback in the Arena Football League
- Billy Minor, NFL's Philadelphia Eagles and Arena League's Dallas Texans

== Personal ==
Vowell lives in Campbell, Texas, just south of Commerce, with his wife Jan.

== Honors ==
- 2 Time Lone Star Conference Coach of the Year (1988, 1990)
- 2 Time Lone Star Conference Champion (1983 as an ASST), 1990 (As Head Coach)
- 3 Time NCAA Division II Playoff Qualifier (1990, 1991, 1995)
- Texas A&M University-Commerce Athletic Hall of Fame (2011)

== Head coaching record ==
=== College ===
Year	Team	Overall	Conference	Standing	Bowl/playoffs	NCAA D-II^{#}
East Texas State / Texas A&M–Commerce Lions (Lone Star Conference) (1986–1998)
1986	East Texas State	2–9	1–5	5th		
1987	East Texas State	2–9	0–5	6th		
1988	East Texas State	8–3	5–2	2nd		15
1989	East Texas State	4–6	2–5	5th		
1990	East Texas State	10–3	7–0	1st	L NCAA Division II Quarterfinal	7
1991	East Texas State	8–4–1	4–1–1	T–2nd	L NCAA Division II Quarterfinal	19
1992	East Texas State	8–3	5–1	2nd		14
1993	East Texas State	5–6	1–4	5th		
1994	East Texas State	5–5	2–3	4th		
1995	East Texas State	8–4	6–1	2nd	L NCAA Division II First Round	11
1996	Texas A&M–Commerce	7–4	4–3	T–3rd		20
1997	Texas A&M–Commerce	3–8	2–5	7th		
1998	Texas A&M–Commerce	3–8	3–6	7th		
East Texas State / Texas A&M–Commerce:		73–72–1	42–40–1			
Total:		73–72–1				
National championship Conference title Conference division title or championship game berth
