= Wes Smith (American football) =

American football player (born 1963)

No. 84
- Position: Wide receiver

Personal information
- Born: June 24, 1963 (age 63)
- Listed height: 6 ft 1 in (1.85 m)
- Listed weight: 190 lb (86 kg)

Career information
- College: East Texas State
- NFL draft: 1986: 10th round, 255th overall pick

Career history
- St. Louis Cardinals (1986); Green Bay Packers (1987)

Career NFL statistics
- Games played: 1
- Stats at Pro Football Reference

Wes Smith (born June 24, 1963) is an American former professional football player who was a wide receiver in the National Football League (NFL). Smith was selected in the 1986 NFL draft as a tenth-round selection by the St. Louis Cardinals and was later a member of the Green Bay Packers. He played collegiate athletics for East Texas A&M ( East Texas State University)

Smith gained All American Honors in Football as a receiver as well as track & field while at Texas A&M Commerce. In track & field, Smith competed in the 100 meters, 400 meter hurdles, 4x100 relay and 4x400 relay.

Smith was voted to the Lone Star Conference All Decade team of the 1980s. held career and single season receiving records in career yards, career receptions, yards per reception, season receiving TD's and career receiving TD's.
