= Ernest Hawkins Field at Memorial Stadium =

College sports stadium in Commerce, Texas

Coordinates: 33°14′45″N 95°54′36″W

- "The Hawk"
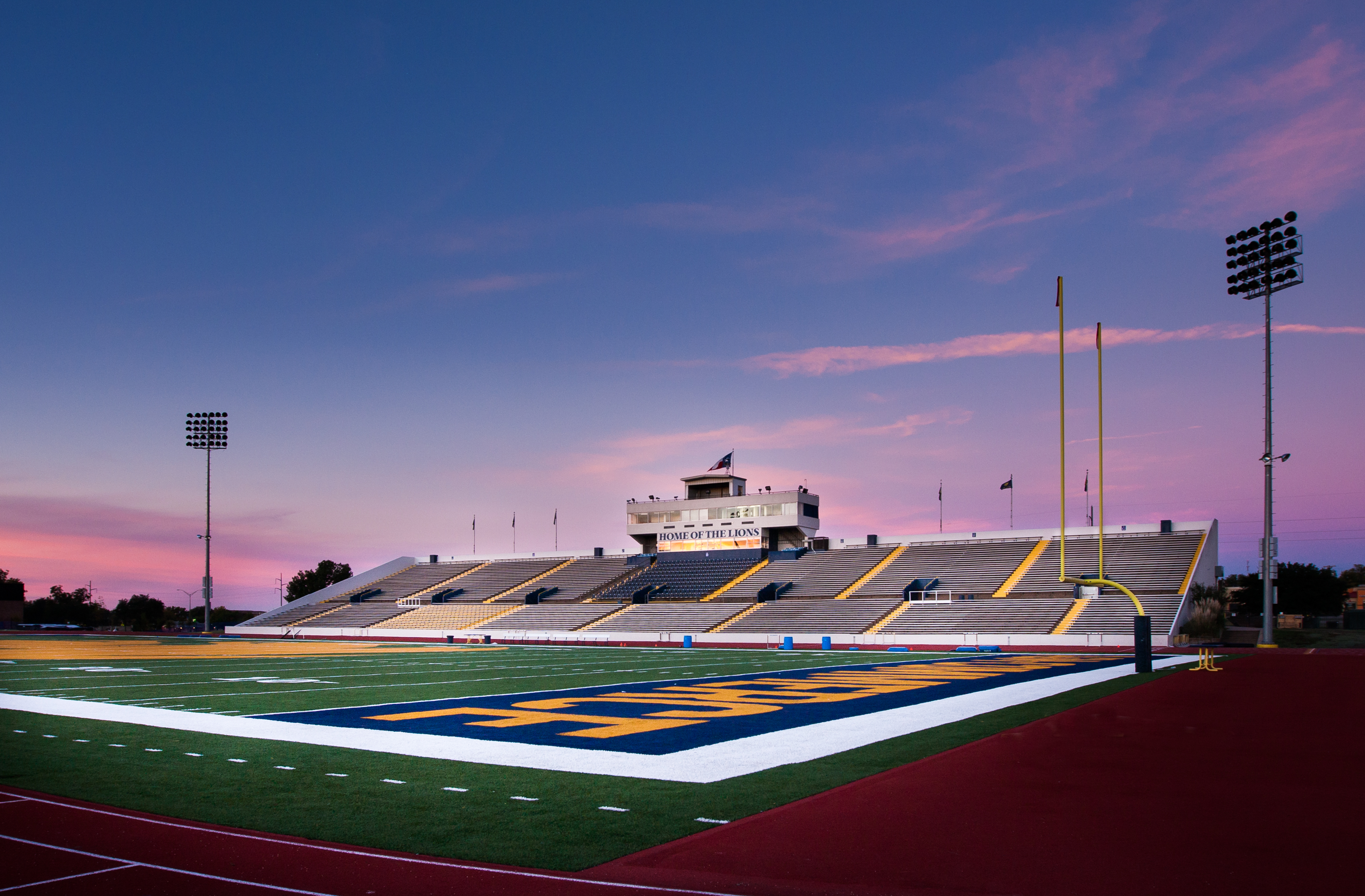
- Interactive map of Ernest Hawkins Field at Memorial Stadium
- Location: Frontage Road, Commerce, Texas, 75248
- Owner: East Texas A&M University
- Operator: East Texas A&M University
- Capacity: 11,582
- Executive suites: 5
- Surface: FieldTurf (2006–present); Natural grass (1950–2006)
- Record attendance: 10,120 (December 9, 2017 vs. Harding Bison, in the NCAA Division II Semifinals)

Construction
- Groundbreaking: September, 1949
- Opened: September 23, 1950
- Renovated: 1973, 1980, 1987, 1999, 2006, 2009, 2010, 2013, 2017, 2020
- Expanded: 1973, 2009–2010
- Cost: $325,000 (1950) (Costs would be roughly $4.25 million in 2010)

Tenants
- East Texas A&M Lions football (NAIA/NCAA) (1950–present); East Texas A&M men's & women's track and field (NAIA/NCAA); Commerce High School (UIL) (1960–2023)

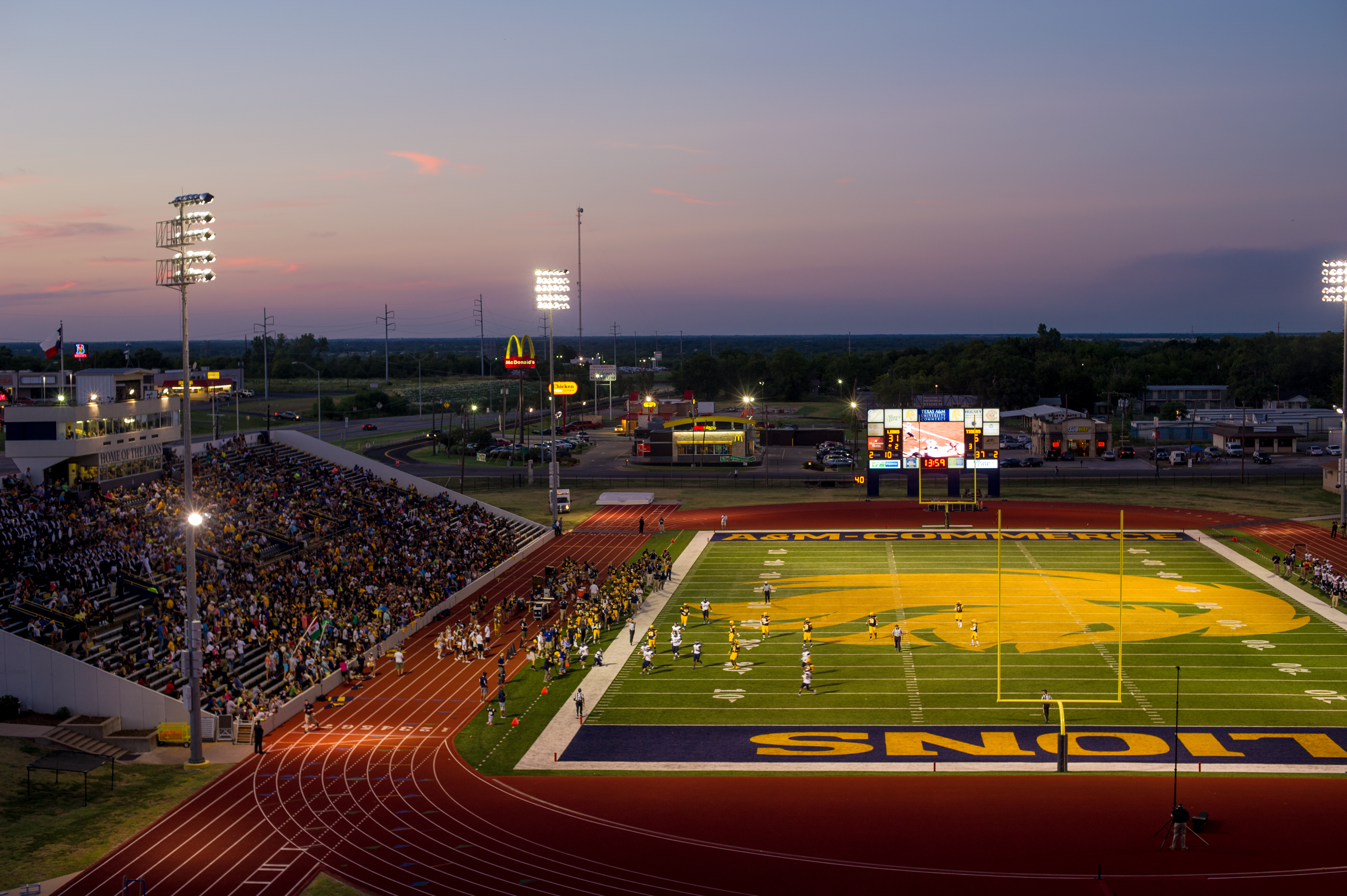
Memorial Stadium in 2014 during a football game between ETAMU and East Texas Baptist

Ernest Hawkins Field at Memorial Stadium is an athletic stadium located in Commerce, Texas. It is primarily used for American football, and is the home field of the East Texas A&M University Lions football team, East Texas A&M men's and women's Track and Field, and was the Commerce High School Tigers Football team of the Commerce Independent School District from 1960-2023. Prior to 1996, the stadium was named "East Texas State Memorial Stadium, and until the end of the 2017 season, it was known as Texas A&M–Commerce Memorial Stadium." The stadium was built in honor of the 78 East Texas A&M alums and students who fought and died during World War II. The stadium was renamed Ernest Hawkins Field at Memorial Stadium was formally changed in November 2017 in honor of longtime Lion football coach Ernest Hawkins.

== Stadium history ==
Memorial Stadium began as a project of the Ex-Students Association in the fall of 1945. The ESA and friends of the university raised a portion of the funds before the university itself received a state appropriation for the rest of the $300,000 to build the facility. Construction on the facility was started in the fall of 1949 and work continued quickly to have the stadium ready for the start of the 1950 season. The stadium was opened and dedicated on Sept. 23, 1950 with a game against regional rival the University of North Texas. The dedication ceremony featured U.S. Speaker of the House and Texas A&M Commerce alumnus Sam Rayburn and former Texas lieutenant governor Walter Woodul. General Douglas MacArthur, while not in attendance, wrote to then University President James Gee that "I am delighted and honored," to have his quotation affixed to the plaque honoring the Lions fallen comrades. That quote, also chiseled on the stadium at the U.S. Military Academy at West Point, is a famous one:

"Upon the fields of friendly strife, are sown the seeds that, Upon other fields, on other days, will bear the fruits of victory."

The Lions and Eagles played before a capacity crowd of 12,000 fans from all over North Texas that night as the Eagles came out on top 42–20. It has proven over the history of the Stadium to be one of the few home losses for Lion football, as they have won nearly 70 percent of the games they have played at home. In 1996, when the Texas A&M University System purchased East Texas State University, the name was changed from ETSU Memorial Stadium to Texas A&M University-Commerce Memorial Stadium.

== Renovations and modifications ==
- 1973 – President's suite and box was added to the press box, along with 4 other rooms for viewing the game, making 5 suites in all. Aluminum bleachers were brought in to replace the concrete seating, and the T-Lounge was built for the Football program to house the dressing and training rooms for the team at the south end zone.
- 1978 – The athletic department and University officials decided to demolish the 2,000 visitor stands on the east side of the stadium and fill that space with tennis courts to be able to host the Lone Star Conference and NAIA national tennis tournaments. Also, fewer visitor fans were making the trip to Commerce due to the expanding distance between the conference schools. The result was reducing the capacity of the stadium to 10,000 fans.
- 1980 – An All-Weather rubberized surface track was installed, replacing the cinder surface.
- 1987 – A new ticket booth was placed at the main entrance of the stadium.
- 1999 – New stadium lighting fixtures were installed and the scoreboard updated with local sponsorships.
- 2006 – The natural grass surface was replaced with a FieldTurf artificial playing surface, a new digital messaging scoreboard was installed and replaced the previous scoreboard. The track was also repaved and the press box was decorated with a bold print message that reads HOME OF THE LIONS.
- 2010 – The east side stands were replaced with new seating technology that increased the capacity to 11,582. The new stadium also added an east side press box, new restrooms and concessions, a new dressing and locker room for the Lion Football program at the north end of the stadium and the T-Lounge was demolished. A Daktronics video jumbotron scoreboard was installed that at the time of completion the largest video board in all of NCAA Division II athletics.
- 2013 – The playing surface is replaced again, this time showing a large Lion head that stretches 50 yards long and 50 yards wide, making it possibly the largest on site logo in the entire world according to the Guinness Book of World Records, this lasted until 2019 when the university replaced the turf and used a smaller traditional sized logo. The west side is also renovated, adding nearly 500 reserved section seats for season ticket holders and also has various cosmetic improvements around the stadium.
- 2014 – The school athletic department creates a corporate sponsorship with Ben E. Keith and GoodSport and puts new signage on the outer facade of the stadium honoring the 1972 National Championship team, and individual murals for former Lions Bobby Bounds, Gary Compton, Ernest Hawkins, Tevin Moore, and Billy Watkins, honoring the records they hold for the school.
- 2017 – The We Are Lions Lounge was built on the concourse level of the stadium, this lounge will former letterwinners and Lion Champions Fund donors.
- 2020 – The home team locker room was expanded and renamed the Champions Center, the expansion included new locker room areas, athletic training facilities, and equipment and laundry upgrades. Also in 2020, the Daktronics video scoreboard was expanded to a full videoboard with enhanced sound system.

== Notable games ==
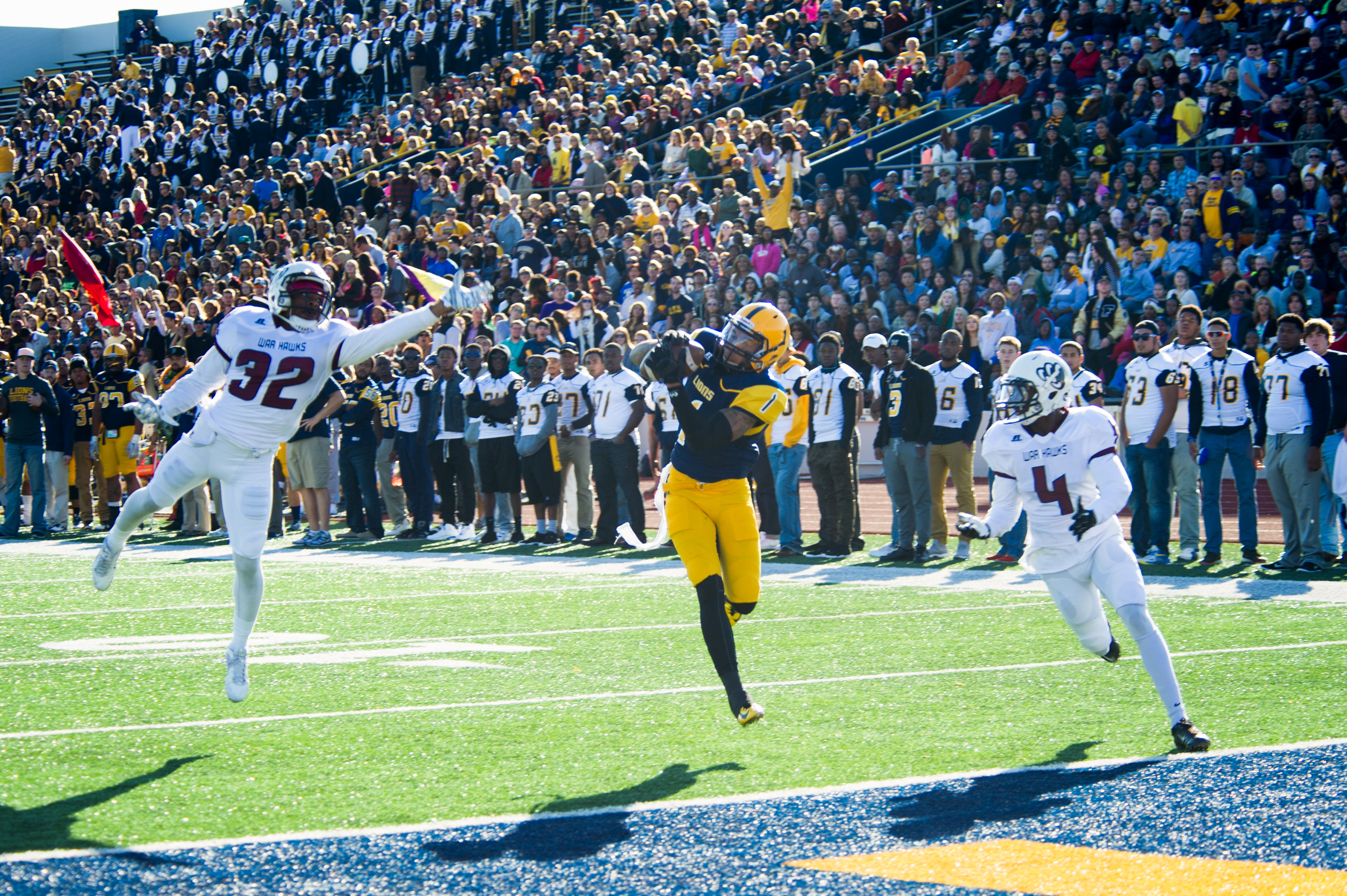
A football game between the A&M-Commerce Lions and the McMurry War Hawks at Memorial Stadium

- The first game was played in September 1950 against the University of North Texas.
- 1966 – vs. Texas A&M–Kingsville on a fourth and goal play Lion QB Ben Kirkland threw a pass at the back of the end zone that was caught by Tom Black, giving Head Coach Ernest Hawkins his first conference championship with a 21–20 win.
- 1969 – vs. Stephen F. Austin State the Lions would have another miraculous game winner in the closing seconds, James Dietz lofted a perfect pass to George Daskalakes for a touchdown and again for a two-point conversion to beat the Lumberjacks, 36–35 and force SFA to share the conference title with the Lions.
- November 1972 – The Lions defeat the number one ranked Central Oklahoma 54–0 in the NAIA national semifinals to clinch a spot in the NAIA national championship game.
- December 1972 – In front of much of Northeast Texas, the Lions defeated Carson–Newman, 21–18 for the 1972 NAIA Division I national football championship on a bitterly cold December afternoon.
- October 1977 – Texas A&M–Kingsville's 46-game unbeaten streak ended when Lions kicker Tom Hay split the uprights with an extra-point to defeat the Javelinas, 7–6.
- September 1991 – Another national streak ended on a humid September night as the Lions defeated the Pittsburg State, 20–13. Pittsburg State came into Commerce riding a 56-game winning streak and would go on to win the Division II National Championship later that season.
- November 1991 – The Lions host their first NCAA playoff contest and defeat Grand Valley State, 36–15.
- September 4, 2014 – the Lions opened the season with a record-breaking performance, defeating East Texas Baptist by a score of 98–20. During this game the offense produced 13 touchdowns, 98 points, and 986 total yards of offense. The win gained the Lions national exposure as it was reported on ESPN's SportsCenter that same night. The next day, head coach Colby Carthel was interviewed by ESPN's Linda Cohn in regards to the win. In that win the Lions set national and conference records for points scored, yards gained, and total offense in a game. On November 1, 2014, the Lions reached the 90 point mark for a second time during their homecoming game against McMurry. The Lions won by a score of 91–13 and clinched their first Lone Star Conference title under head coach Colby Carthel.

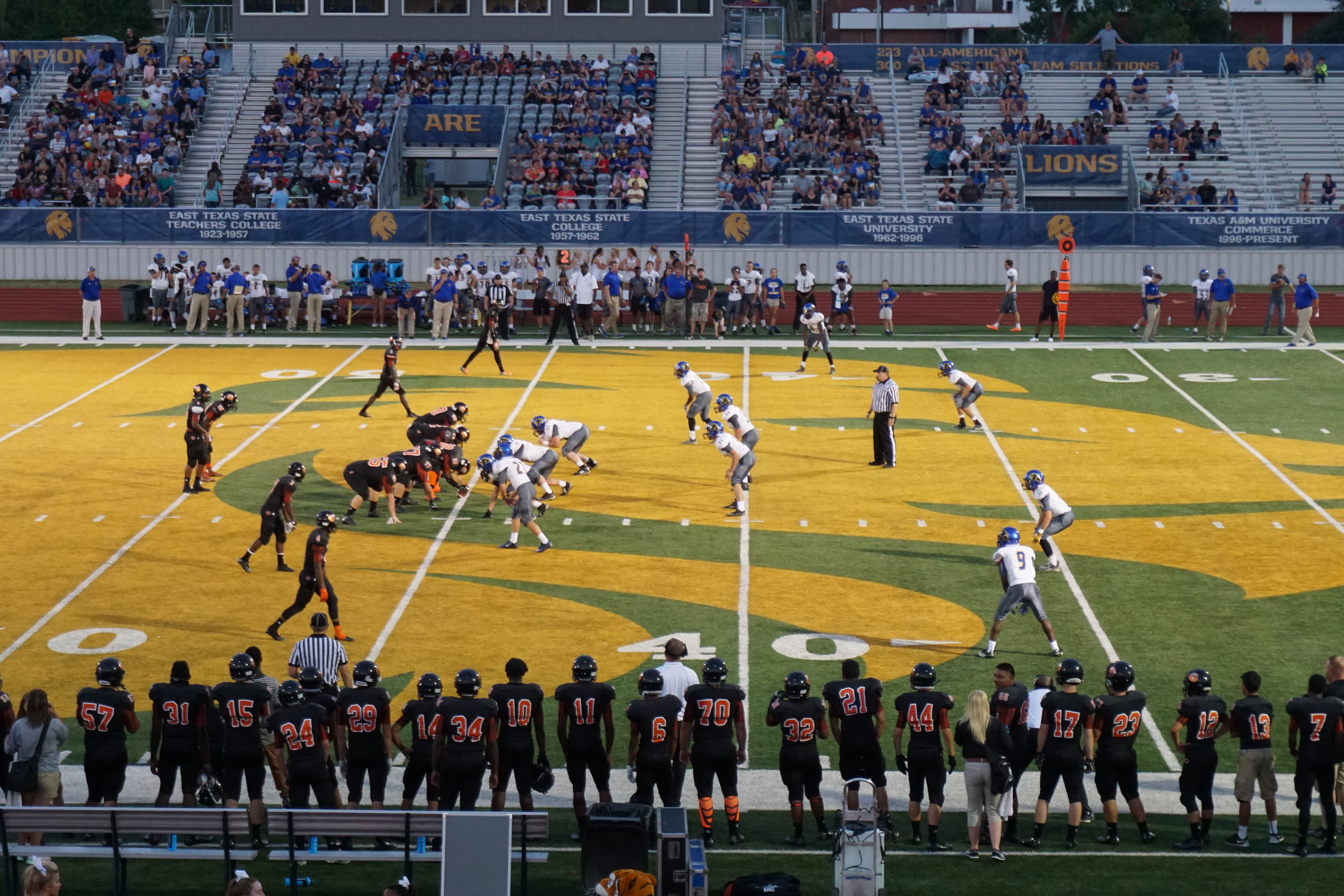
A football game between the Commerce Tigers and the North Lamar Panthers at Memorial Stadium

- 2015 – During the season, the Lions hosted two nationally televised games at Memorial Stadium. The first of which was a hard-fought 38–35 victory over Angelo State that ended up being broadcast on ESPN. The second game was broadcast on American Sports Network, where the Lions fell in the Lone Star Conference playoff title game against the Midwestern State Mustangs by a score of 37–33.
- December 9, 2017 – A new stadium record attendance of 10,120 was set as the Lions defeated Harding 31–17 in an NCAA Division II Semifinal game.

== Attendance ==
Rk.	Date	Opponent	Attendance	Result
Highest attendance
1	December 9, 2017	Harding	10,120	W 31–17
2	September 9, 2017	William Jewell	10,108	W 59–6
3	October 29, 2016	West Texas A&M	9,629	W 36–0
4	October 11, 2014	McMurry	9,496	W 91–13
5	October 30, 1976	Southwest Texas State	9,250	W 23–8
6	September 16, 2017	Eastern New Mexico	9,233	W 51–22
7	October 8, 2016	Midwestern State	9,208	L 25–26
8	October 27, 2018	West Texas A&M	9,168	W 41–16
9	October 2, 1976	Howard Payne	9,123	W 46–0
10	October 9, 1976	Texas A&I	8,750	L 0–37

Attendance records available 1976, 1983–84, 1989–2007, and 2009–present. Inaugural game against North Texas State on September 23, 1950, is said to have had an attendance of over 12,000 but no official attendance records are available for that game.

== Other functions ==
In addition to football games for East Texas A&M, it also hosts college and high school track meets, including the University Interscholastic League's Conference 4A Region II track meet, which is a precursor to the Texas High School State Track meet in Austin. It also hosts Texas High School football playoff games due to Commerce's proximity to the Dallas, Texas metro area and also to the far northwestern parts of East Texas.

Notable High School Games

- Fall 2001 – Commerce High School hosted the Forney Jackrabbits in a Class AAA district game in front of a standing room only crowd of over 10,000 fans. The Jackrabbits defeated the Tigers, but the Tigers would go on to win the Class AAA Division II State Championship.

== See also ==
- List of NCAA Division I FCS football stadiums
