= George Vest (coach) =

American football and basketball coach (1907–1997)

Biographical details
- Born: December 17, 1907; Martindale, Texas, U.S.
- Died: November 15, 1997 (aged 89); Houston, Texas, U.S.

Playing career

Football
- 1925–1928: Southwest Texas State

Basketball
- 1925–1929: Southwest Texas State

Baseball
- 1926–1929: Southwest Texas State

Track
- 1926–1927: Southwest Texas State

Tennis
- 1929: Southwest Texas State
- Positions: Fullbaclk (football); Catcher (baseball); High jump (track)

Coaching career (HC unless noted)

Football
- 1929–1932: Donna JHS (TX)
- 1933–1936: Donna HS (TX)
- 1937–1941: Southwest Texas State (assistant)
- 1946–1950: Southwest Texas State

Basketball
- 1939–1942: Southwest Texas State

Head coaching record
- Overall: 30–17–3 (football); 36–29 (basketball)

Accomplishments and honors

Championships
- Football; 1 LSC (1948)

George Waverly Vest Sr. (December 17, 1907 – November 15, 1997) was an American football and basketball coach. He served as the head football coach at Southwest Texas State Teachers College—now known as Texas State University–from 1946 to 1950, compiling a record of 30–17–3. Vest was also the head basketball coach at Southwest Texas State from 1939 to 1942, tallying a mark of 36–29.

Vest was born on December 17, 1907, in Martindale, Texas. He attended Southwest Texas State Teachers College, where he played football, basketball, and baseball and ran track before graduating in 1929 with a Bachelor of Science degree in chemistry. He later earned a master's degree in physical education from the University of Texas at Austin. Vest began his coaching career in Donna, Texas, mentoring the junior high school football team. He was promoted to head football coach at Donna High School in 1933. Vest returned to his alma mater, Southwest Texas State, in 1937 as an assistant coach.

Vest enlisted in the United States Army on July 13, 1942, and then attended Officer Candidate School. He served during World War II in Karachi, reaching the rank of major before his discharge in 1946. Vest died on November 15, 1997, in Houston.

== Head coaching record ==
=== Football ===
Year	Team	Overall	Conference	Standing	Bowl/playoffs
Southwest Texas State Bobcats (Lone Star Conference) (1946–1950)
1946	Southwest Texas State	6–2–2	3–2	4th	
1947	Southwest Texas State	5–4	4–2	T–2nd	
1948	Southwest Texas State	8–1	6–0	1st	
1949	Southwest Texas State	3–6–1	0–3	4th	
1950	Southwest Texas State	6–3	2–2	T–2nd	
Southwest Texas State:		30–17–3	15–9		
Total:		30–17–3			
National championship Conference title Conference division title or championship game berth
