= DNHS =

DNHS is an abbreviation that may refer to:

- Del Norte High School (disambiguation)
- Divisoria National High School, Divisoria, Bontoc, Southern Leyte, Philippines
- Dalandanan National High School, Valenzuela City, Metro Manila, Philippines
- D N Himatsingka High School, Kokrajhar, Assam, India
- Dadabhai Navroji High School, Anand, Gujarat, India
- Donna North High School, Hidalgo County, Texas
