= Muniz, Texas =

- Census-designated place
- Coordinates: 26°15′16″N 98°5′25″W
- Country: United States of America
- State: Texas
- County: Hidalgo

Area
  - Total: 1.1 sq mi (2.8 km^{2})
  - Land: 1.1 sq mi (2.8 km^{2})
  - Water: 0 sq mi (0.0 km^{2})
- Elevation: 89 ft (27 m)

Population (2020)
  - Total: 1,593
  - Density: 1,500/sq mi (570/km^{2})
- Time zone: UTC-6 (Central (CST))
  - Summer (DST): UTC-5 (CDT)
- FIPS code: 48-50058
- GNIS feature ID: 1852740

Muniz is a census-designated place (CDP) in Hidalgo County, Texas, United States. The population was 1,593 at the 2020 United States Census. It is part of the McAllen-Edinburg-Mission metropolitan area.

As of 2015 Muniz, a colonia, has about half of its population born in foreign countries, with, in all probability, almost all from Mexico, and with many of them being illegal immigrants. In 2015 Chris McGreal of The Guardian described Muniz as the poorest U.S. settlement along a United States border.

== History ==
The community received street lights in 2013.

== Geography ==
Muniz is located at 26°15′16″N 98°5′25″W (26.254502, -98.090230).

According to the United States Census Bureau, the CDP has a total area of 1.1 square miles (2.8 km^{2}), all land.

It is located about 7 miles (11 km) east of the center of McAllen. As of 2015 the community has no public transportation. Sizes and conditions of houses vary; many are made of cement and/or wood.

== Demographics ==
Historical population
| Census | Pop. | Note | %± |
|---|---|---|---|
| 2000 | 1,106 | | — |
| 2010 | 1,370 | | 23.9% |
| 2020 | 1,593 | | 16.3% |
U.S. Decennial Census; 1850–1900 1910; 1920 1930 1940; 1950 1960 1970; 1980 1990 2000; 2010 2020

Muniz first appeared as a census designated place in the 2000 U.S. census.

=== 2020 census ===
Muniz CDP, Texas – Racial and ethnic composition Note: the US Census treats Hispanic/Latino as an ethnic category. This table excludes Latinos from the racial categories and assigns them to a separate category. Hispanics/Latinos may be of any race.
| Race / Ethnicity (NH = Non-Hispanic) | Pop 2000 | Pop 2010 | Pop 2020 | % 2000 | % 2010 | % 2020 |
|---|---|---|---|---|---|---|
| White alone (NH) | 11 | 3 | 20 | 0.99% | 0.22% | 1.26% |
| Black or African American alone (NH) | 0 | 0 | 1 | 0.00% | 0.00% | 0.06% |
| Native American or Alaska Native alone (NH) | 0 | 0 | 5 | 0.00% | 0.00% | 0.31% |
| Asian alone (NH) | 0 | 0 | 2 | 0.00% | 0.00% | 0.13% |
| Native Hawaiian or Pacific Islander alone (NH) | 0 | 0 | 0 | 0.00% | 0.00% | 0.00% |
| Other race alone (NH) | 0 | 0 | 0 | 0.00% | 0.00% | 0.00% |
| Mixed race or Multiracial (NH) | 0 | 0 | 6 | 0.00% | 0.00% | 0.38% |
| Hispanic or Latino (any race) | 1,095 | 1,367 | 1,559 | 99.01% | 99.78% | 97.87% |
| Total | 1,106 | 1,370 | 1,593 | 100.00% | 100.00% | 100.00% |

As of the census of 2000, there were 1,106 people, 232 households, and 221 families residing in the CDP. The population density was 1,037.4 inhabitants per square mile (400.5/km^{2}). There were 259 housing units at an average density of 242.9 per square mile (93.8/km^{2}). The racial makeup of the CDP was 63.74% White, 0.36% Native American, 35.62% from other races, and 0.27% from two or more races. Hispanic or Latino of any race were 99.01% of the population.

There were 232 households, out of which 75.0% had children under the age of 18 living with them, 74.6% were married couples living together, 16.4% had a female householder with no husband present, and 4.7% were non-families. 3.4% of all households were made up of individuals, and 2.6% had someone living alone who was 65 years of age or older. The average household size was 4.77 and the average family size was 4.78.

In the CDP, the population was spread out, with 48.8% under the age of 18, 11.7% from 18 to 24, 28.0% from 25 to 44, 9.5% from 45 to 64, and 2.0% who were 65 years of age or older. The median age was 19 years. For every 100 females, there were 105.2 males. For every 100 females age 18 and over, there were 97.2 males.

The median income for a household in the CDP was $13,547, and the median income for a family was $13,229. Males had a median income of $12,353 versus $11,413 for females. The per capita income for the CDP was $3,230. About 84.7% of families and 86.1% of the population were below the poverty line, including 97.4% of those under age 18 and 100.0% of those age 65 or over.

In 2010, Muniz had the second-lowest median household income of all places in the United States with a population over 1,000. As of 2015 Muniz has about half of its population born in foreign countries, with, in all probability, almost all from Mexico, and with many of them being illegal immigrants.

== Education ==
Muniz is in the Donna Independent School District. Residents are divided between Garza Elementary School and Singleterry Elementary School. All residents are zoned to Sauceda Middle School and Donna North High School.

In addition, South Texas Independent School District operates magnet schools that serve the community.
