= 1950 Sam Houston State Bearkats football team =

American college football season

1950 Sam Houston State Bearkats football
- Conference: Lone Star Conference
- Record: 5–5 (1–3 LSC)
- Head coach: Puny Wilson (10th season)
- Home stadium: Pritchett Field

1950 Lone Star Conference football standings
	Conf.					Overall
Team	W		L		T	W		L		T
Sul Ross $	3	–	0	–	1	8	–	2	–	1
Southwest Texas State	2	–	2	–	0	6	–	3	–	0
Stephen F. Austin	2	–	2	–	0	5	–	5	–	0
East Texas State	1	–	2	–	1	4	–	5	–	2
Sam Houston State	1	–	3	–	0	5	–	5	–	0
$ – Conference champion

The 1950 Sam Houston State Bearkats football team represented Sam Houston State Teachers College (now known as Sam Houston State University) as a member of the Lone Star Conference (LSC) during the 1950 college football season. Led by tenth-year head coach Puny Wilson, the Bearkats compiled an overall record of 5–5 with a mark of 1–3 in conference play, and finished fifth in the LSC.

== Schedule ==
Date	Time	Opponent	Site	Result	Attendance	Source
September 16		Sul Ross	Pritchett Field; Huntsville, TX	L 8–9		
September 23		at Southwestern (TX)*	Snyder Field; Georgetown, TX	W 8–7	3,000	
September 30		at East Texas Baptist*	Maverick Field; Marshall, TX	W 2–0		
October 7		Corpus Christi*	Pritchett Field; Huntsville, TX	W 46–0		
October 14		Lamar Tech*	Pritchett Field; Huntsville, TX	W 45–0		
October 21		at West Texas State*	Buffalo Stadium; Canyon, TX	L 18–39		
October 28		at East Texas State	Memorial Stadium; Commerce, TX	L 0–12		
November 4	2:15 p.m.	at Midwestern (TX)*	Coyote Stadium; Wichita Falls, TX	L 20–23	3,500	
November 11		Southwest Texas State	Pritchett Field; Huntsville, TX (rivalry)	L 13–20		
November 18		Stephen F. Austin	Pritchett Field; Huntsville, TX (rivalry)	W 20–6		
*Non-conference game; All times are in Central time
