= Del Norte =

Del Norte may refer to:

== Places ==
- Del Norte (airport), Monterrey, Mexico
- Del Norte, California
- Del Norte, Colorado
- Del Norte BART, a transit hub in El Cerrito, California
- Del Norte County, California
- Mall del Norte, in Laredo, Texas

== Other uses ==
- Del Norte salamander (Plethodon elongatus)
- Del Norte Titan, a tree

== See also ==
- Del Norte High School (disambiguation)
