= 1950 Sul Ross Lobos football team =

American college football season

1950 Sul Ross Lobos football

LSC champion
- Conference: Lone Star Conference
- Record: 8–2–1 (3–0–1 LSC)
- Head coach: Paul Pierce (5th season)
- Home stadium: Jackson Field

1950 Lone Star Conference football standings
	Conf.					Overall
Team	W		L		T	W		L		T
Sul Ross $	3	–	0	–	1	8	–	2	–	1
Southwest Texas State	2	–	2	–	0	6	–	3	–	0
Stephen F. Austin	2	–	2	–	0	5	–	5	–	0
East Texas State	1	–	2	–	1	4	–	5	–	2
Sam Houston State	1	–	3	–	0	5	–	5	–	0
$ – Conference champion

The 1950 Sul Ross Lobos football team was an American football team that represented Sul Ross State College (now known as Sul Ross State University) during the 1950 college football season as a member of the Lone Star Conference (LSC). Led by fifth-year head coach Paul Pierce, the Lobos compiled an overall record of 8–2–1 and went 3–0–1 in conference play, winning the LSC conference title.

== Schedule ==
Date	Opponent	Site	Result	Attendance	Source
September 16	at Sam Houston State	Pritchett Field; Huntsville, TX	W 9–8		
September 23	vs. Abilene Christian*	Midland, TX	L 0–34		
September 30	Daniel Baker*	Jackson Field; Alpine, TX	W 35–0		
October 7	at Southwest Texas State	Evans Field; San Marcos, TX	W 21–12	3,500	
October 14	Trinity (TX)*	Jackson Field; Alpine, TX	W 25–21		
October 21	Corpus Christi*^{†}	Jackson Field; Alpine, TX	W 13–0		
October 28	at Texas A&I*	Javelina Stadium; Kingsville, TX	L 13–14		
November 4	at Stephen F. Austin	Memorial Stadium; Nacogdoches, TX	W 34–7		
November 11	New Mexico Western*	Jackson Field; Alpine, TX	W 26–19		
November 18	East Texas Baptist*	Jackson Field; Alpine, TX	W 41–20		
December 2	at East Texas State	Memorial Stadium; Commerce, TX	T 7–7		
*Non-conference game; ^{†}Homecoming
