= 1948 Salad Bowl =

Nevada Wolf Pack	North Texas State Teachers Eagles
(8–2)	(10–1)
13	6
Head coach: Joe Sheeketski	Head coach: Odus Mitchell
	1	2	3	4	Total
Nevada	0	7	0	6	13
North Texas State Teachers	6	0	0	0	6
- Date: January 1, 1948
- Season: 1947
- Stadium: Montgomery Stadium
- Location: Phoenix, Arizona
- National anthem: Marching Bands
- Attendance: 12,500

The 1948 Salad Bowl was a postseason American college football bowl game between the Nevada Wolf Pack and the North Texas State Eagles at Montgomery Stadium in Phoenix, Arizona, on January 1, 1948. The game marked the first bowl game for Nevada and the second for North Texas.

It was the 1st edition of the annual Salad Bowl. North Texas represented the Lone Star Conference in the contest, while Nevada competed as an Independent. In a defensive struggle, Nevada would earn their first bowl win with a 13–6 victory.

== Organization of the game ==
The Salad Bowl began as the idea of Herb Askins, a prominent businessman in the Phoenix area and the president of the Phoenix Kiwanis Club. The game was intended to serve as a community-minded fund raiser with all proceeds going to local charities that helped handicapped children. Although the seeds for the Salad Bowl were planted in Askin's mind prior to World War II, the game would not come to fruition until 1948.

The site of the game was Montgomery Stadium at Phoenix Union High School. Arizona State College's Goodwin Stadium was entertained as a possible site of the game although it was ultimately rejected as Montgomery had a seating capacity of 23,000 as opposed to Goodwin's 15,000.

== Background ==
The Eagles entered their second bowl game with a 10–1 record and the Lone Star Conference championship in hand. The 1947 team was dominant, holding 5 opponents scoreless and 10 to a touchdown or less. The Eagles' lone loss was a 12–0 defeat against Arkansas in Little Rock which was followed by a victory in Gainesville against Florida.

The Nevada Wolf Pack also entered its first bowl game with an 8–2 record. The Wolfpack was led by All-American and Heisman Finalist Stan Heath. Nevada originally accepted its invitation to the salad bowl however, weeks prior to the game, the team voted not to participate in the game. Nevada ultimately attended after the threat of lawsuit.

== Game summary ==
North Texas scored first before Nevada added a pair of touchdowns, with the second one coming late in the fourth quarter. A missed extra point kept North Texas within a touchdown, but a final drive stalled at the Nevada 28 when a likely game–winning score was dropped in the end zone. All players received a wristwatch after the game as a token of appreciation.

== See also ==
- Salad Bowl (disambiguation)
- List of college bowl games
