= 1950 Southwest Texas State Bobcats football team =

American college football season

1950 Southwest Texas State Bobcats football
- Conference: Lone Star Conference
- Record: 6–3 (2–2 LSC)
- Head coach: George Vest (5th season)
- Home stadium: Evans Field

1950 Lone Star Conference football standings
	Conf.					Overall
Team	W		L		T	W		L		T
Sul Ross $	3	–	0	–	1	8	–	2	–	1
Southwest Texas State	2	–	2	–	0	6	–	3	–	0
Stephen F. Austin	2	–	2	–	0	5	–	5	–	0
East Texas State	1	–	2	–	1	4	–	5	–	2
Sam Houston State	1	–	3	–	0	5	–	5	–	0
$ – Conference champion

The 1950 Southwest Texas State Bobcats football team was an American football team that represented Southwest Texas State Teachers College (now known as Texas State University) during the 1950 college football season as a member of the Lone Star Conference (LSC). In their fifth year under head coach George Vest, the team compiled an overall record of 6–3 with a mark of 2–2 in conference play.

== Schedule ==
Date	Opponent	Site	Result	Attendance	Source
September 16	Southwestern (TX)*	Evans Field; San Marcos, TX	L 7–28		
September 23	Corpus Christi*	Evans Field; San Marcos, TX	W 13–12		
September 30	at Texas A&I*	Javelina Stadium; Kingsville, TX	W 7–6		
October 7	Sul Ross	Evans Field; San Marcos, TX	L 12–21	3,500	
October 21	Stephen F. Austin^{†}	Evans Field; San Marcos, TX	L 14–21	4,000	
October 28	at Howard Payne*	Brownwood, TX	W 27–21		
November 4	East Texas Baptist*	Evans Field; San Marcos, TX	W 31–14		
November 11	at Sam Houston State	Pritchett Field; Huntsville, TX (rivalry)	W 20–13		
November 18	at East Texas State	Memorial Stadium; Commerce, TX	W 14–0		
*Non-conference game; ^{†}Homecoming
