= 1949 East Texas State Lions football team =

American college football season

1949 East Texas State Lions football

LSC champion
- Conference: Lone Star Conference
- Record: 5–3–1 (3–0 LSC)
- Head coach: Bob Berry (11th season)
- Home stadium: Lion Stadium

1949 Lone Star Conference football standings
	Conf.					Overall
Team	W		L		T	W		L		T
East Texas State $	3	–	0	–	0	5	–	3	–	1
Stephen F. Austin	2	–	1	–	0	7	–	2	–	0
Southwest Texas State	1	–	2	–	0	3	–	6	–	1
Sam Houston State	0	–	3	–	0	3	–	7	–	0
$ – Conference champion

The 1949 East Texas State Lions football team was an American football team that represented East Texas State Teachers College—now known as East Texas A&M University–as a member of the Lone Star Conference (LSC) during the 1949 college football season. Led by 11th-year head coach Bob Berry, the Lions compiled an overall record of 5–3–1 with a mark of 3–0 in conference play, winning the LSC title.

== Schedule ==
Date	Opponent	Site	Result	Attendance	Source
September 17	at West Texas State*	Buffalo Stadium; Canyon, TX	L 7–41		
October 1	at Howard Payne*	Lion Stadium; Brownwood, TX	W 26–14	3,500	
October 8	Stephen F. Austin	Lion Stadium; Commerce, TX	W 13–0	6,000	
October 15	Corpus Christi*	Lion Stadium; Commerce, TX	L 7–14		
October 22	Hardin*	Lion Stadium; Commerce, TX	W 25–13		
October 29	at Sam Houston State	Pritchett Field; Huntsville, TX	W 20–13	6,000	
November 5	at Southwest Texas State	Evans Field; San Marcos, TX	W 13–6	5,000	
November 12	Trinity (TX)*	Lion Stadium; Commerce, TX	T 0–0		
November 19	North Texas State*^{†}	Lion Stadium; Commerce, TX	L 6–59	7,500	
*Non-conference game; ^{†}Homecoming
