= 1941 North Texas State Teachers Eagles football team =

American college football season

1941 North Texas State Teachers Eagles football

Lone Star champion
- Conference: Lone Star Conference
- Record: 7–1 (4–0 LSC)
- Head coach: Jack Sisco (13th season)
- Home stadium: Eagle Field

1941 Lone Star Conference football standings
	Conf.					Overall
Team	W		L		T	W		L		T
North Texas State $	4	–	0	–	0	7	–	1	–	0
Southwest Texas State	3	–	1	–	0	4	–	4	–	0
East Texas State	2	–	2	–	0	6	–	2	–	1
Sam Houston State	1	–	3	–	0	2	–	7	–	1
Stephen F. Austin	0	–	4	–	0	1	–	6	–	1
$ – Conference champion

The 1941 North Texas State Teachers Eagles football team represented the North Texas State Teachers College (later renamed the University of North Texas) as a member of the Lone Star Conference (LSC) during the 1941 college football season. In its 13th and final season under head coach Jack Sisco, the team compiled a 7–1 record (4–0 against LSC opponents) and won the LSC championship. The team's loss was against SMU.

North Texas was ranked at No. 160 (out of 681 teams) in the final rankings under the Litkenhous Difference by Score System.

The team played its home games at Eagle Field in Denton, Texas.

== Schedule ==
Date	Opponent	Site	Result	Attendance	Source
September 27	at SMU*	Ownby Stadium; University Park, TX	L 0–54	12,000	
October 4	at Hardin–Simmons*	Parramore Field; Abilene, TX	W 7–3		
October 10	Arkansas A&M*	Eagle Field; Denton, TX	W 60–0		
October 17	at Stephen F. Austin	Nacogdoches, TX	W 28–0		
October 24	Sam Houston State	Eagle Field; Denton, TX	W 19–0		
November 1	at Southwest Texas State	San Marcos, TX	W 10–6		
November 7	Austin*	Eagle Field; Denton, TX	W 26–6		
November 15	East Texas State^{†}	Eagle Field; Denton, TX	W 15–8	8,000	
*Non-conference game; ^{†}Homecoming
