= 1938 Southwest Texas State Bobcats football team =

American college football season

1938 Southwest Texas State Bobcats football
- Conference: Lone Star Conference
- Record: 0–8 (0–4 LSC)
- Head coach: Joe Bailey Cheaney (4th season)
- Home stadium: Evans Field

1938 Lone Star Conference football standings
	Conf.					Overall
Team	W		L		T	W		L		T
East Texas State $	4	–	0	–	0	8	–	1	–	0
Sam Houston State	3	–	1	–	0	8	–	2	–	0
North Texas State	2	–	2	–	0	7	–	4	–	0
Stephen F. Austin	1	–	3	–	0	3	–	5	–	1
Southwest Texas State	0	–	4	–	0	0	–	8	–	0
$ – Conference champion

The 1938 Southwest Texas State Bobcats football team was an American football team that represented Southwest Texas State Teachers College (now known as Texas State University) during the 1938 college football season as a member of the Lone Star Conference (LSC). In their fourth year under head coach Joe Bailey Cheaney, the team compiled an overall record of 0–8 with a mark of 0–4 in conference play.

== Schedule ==
Date	Opponent	Site	Result	Source
September 23	Howard Payne*	Evans Field; San Marcos, TX	L 0–14	
October 1	at St. Edward’s*	House Park; Austin, TX	L 20–33	
October 7	Schreiner*	Evans Field; San Marcos, TX	L 7–19	
October 14	Southwestern (TX)*	Evans Field; San Marcos, TX	L 0–6	
October 29	at Stephen F. Austin	Birdwell Field; Nacogdoches, TX	L 0–33	
November 5	at North Texas State Teachers	Eagle Field; Denton, TX	L 6–7	
November 11	East Texas State	Evans Field; San Marcos, TX	L 7–27	
November 19	Sam Houston State	Evans Field; San Marcos, TX (rivalry)	L 7–13	
*Non-conference game
