= Salad bowl (disambiguation) =

A salad bowl is a serving dish for salad. It can also refer to:

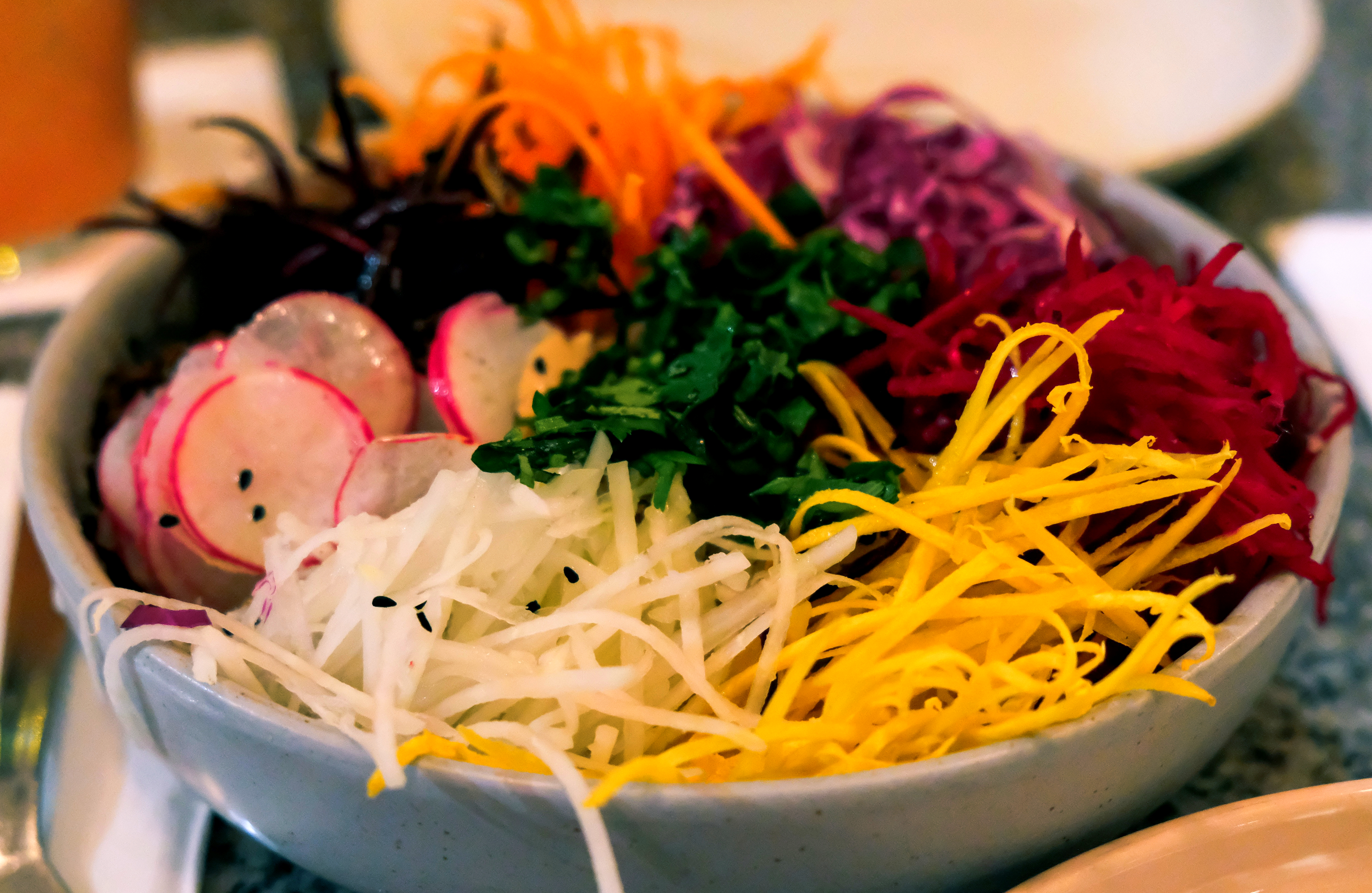
A bowl of salad

- Salad bowl (cultural idea), a cultural idea referring to the United States
- Salad Bowl (game), a defunct, annual, post-season college football bowl game
- Salad Bowl strike, a series of strikes, mass pickets, boycotts and secondary boycotts in 1970, led by César Chávez and United Farm Workers, that led to the largest farm worker strike in U.S. history
- The Salinas Valley in California, often referred to as the world's salad bowl because of the volume of produce exported from the region
- A bowl of salad
- Colloquial term for the Meisterschale, the trophy awarded to the German champions in association football
- Nickname for The Davis Cup Trophy in tennis

== See also ==
- Breadbasket
