= Mule Wilson =

American football player (1901–1937)

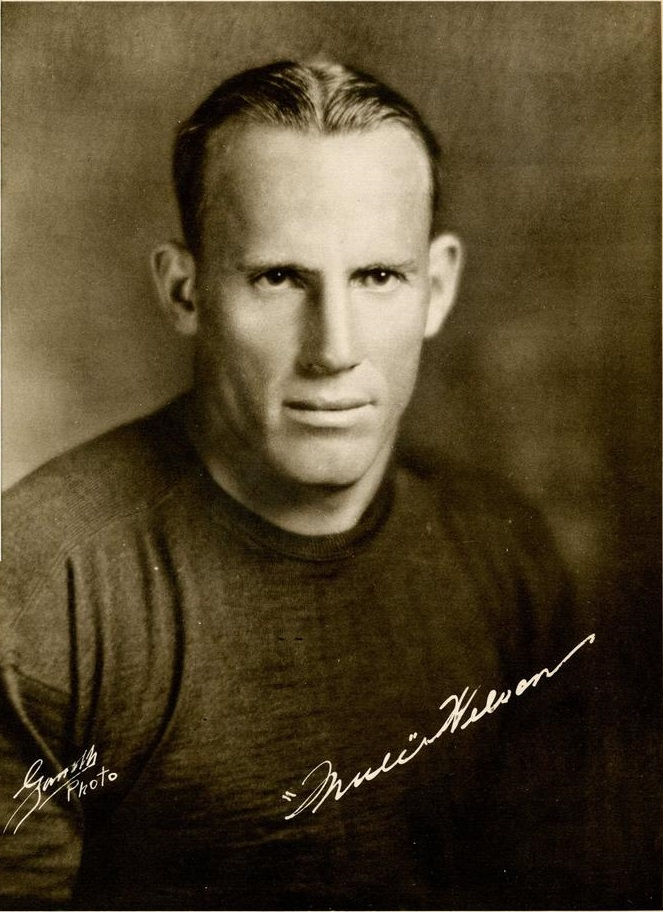

Profile
- Position: Fullback

Personal information
- Born: September 10, 1901; Honey Grove, Texas, U.S.
- Died: July 18, 1937 (aged 35); Austin, Texas, U.S.

Career information
- College: Texas A&M

Career history
- 1926: Buffalo Rangers
- 1927–1930: New York Giants
- 1930: Staten Island Stapletons
- 1930–1931: Green Bay Packers
- 1932–1933: Portsmouth Spartans

Awards and highlights
- First-team All-SWC (1925)

Fay "Mule" Wilson (September 10, 1901 – July 18, 1937) was an American football player. He played in the Buffalo Rangers, New York Giants, Staten Island Stapletons, Green Bay Packers, and Portsmouth Spartans of the National Football League (NFL).

== Biography ==
Wilson was born to Thomas Rufinus Wilson and Nancy Jane Bohannon. He attended Honey Grove High School, where he was a star athlete. Wilson was the quarterback of the 1921 team that lost the state championship to Oak Cliff High School 7-0. After his high school career, he then was a star at Texas A&M, lettering both in football and track. He was a captain on the football team that won the 1925 Southwest Conference Championship. Wilson also was the 1926 Southwest Conference 100 yard sprint champion.

=== 1922 ===
Wilson won the 100- and 200-yard dashes at the 1A state track meet in 1922 and later ran track and played football at Texas A&M. He became the first Texas state high school track champion (and the first Aggie) to play in the NFL.

As a senior at the 1922 state track meet Wilson won the 100-yd dash in 10.2 (a conference 1A record in 1922-24) and 220-yd dash in 23.0 (a conference 1A record from 1922–23) leading his team to a second-place finish in the team competition. There were only two divisions (B and 1A) in the state track meet in 1922 and thus the Honey Grove team competed against all the larger schools in the state and finished second to Austin HS. Honey grove’s Hulen Newberry won the 1A shot put in 1922 at 45’ 05’’ and the two-man “team” of Wilson & Newberry scored 15 points to finish second in the 1A team competition to Austin HS (led by hurdler Mack Keeble with 13 points), which scored 16 points. The three gold medals by Wilson/Newberry remain as the only gold medals won by Honey Grove HS from 1905 to the present.

=== 1923 to 1926 ===
Wilson also ran track at A&M on the freshman (1923) and varsity (1924–26) teams. He finished second in the 100-yd dash at the SWC meet on May 9, 1925, and was 4th in the same event in the 1924 SWC meet. He and Jacob Poth were the top Aggie sprinters and finished 1-2 in several dual meets. The Aggie Yearbook indicated that Wilson majored in special agriculture and graduated in 1926.

Wilson was a track (1924–26) and football (1923-25) star at A&M and was captain of the A&M football team in 1925 that won the conference championship under coach Dana X. Bible, who considered Wilson one of the four greatest backs he ever coached. Wilson was an All-SWC fullback in both 1924 and 1925 and “was noted for his great speed and power and his exceptional punting ability.” He was considered the best punter in the SWC.

Wilson went on to star for the Texas A&M Aggies, where he was a letterman both in football and in track for the years 1923 through 1925. He captained the football team in 1925 when the Aggies captured the conference championship and Wilson was selected all conference fullback for the second straight year. Wilson was also the Southwest Conference 100-yard sprint champion in 1926.

=== 1926 to 1930s ===
Wilson throws a straight-arm in NFL action against Orange Athletic Club, November 1929.

After his time in college, he signed with the Buffalo Rangers. He only played with Buffalo for the 1926 season, then he signed with the New York Giants, and was on the 1927 NFL Championship team.

Wilson became the first (of over 100) HS Texas HS state track champions to play in the NFL as he played in the NFL from 1926-33 playing for Buffalo (1926), the NY Giants (1926–32), Green Bay, and Portsmouth (1933). Wilson, at 5'11" and 192 lbs, played wing back during his 8-year pro career and scored 14 TDs through he was primarily a blocking back. He played on the 1927 Giant team (11-1-1) with Jim Thorpe that won the world’s championship. He became the first Texas Aggie to play in the NFL. And he won 3 world championships (i.e., “Super Bowls”) while in the NFL.

Wilson was also part of the Green Bay Packers championship teams of 1930 and 1931. His career was relatively brief, and injuries cut it short. When he returned home, he was active in the oil industry. Just before his 36th birthday, Wilson suffered a heart attack on July 18, 1937.

== Awards ==
Wilson followed his brother into the Texas A&M Athletic Hall of Fame in 1980 and then the Fannin County sports hall of fame in November 1992. He was also inducted into the Fannin County sports Hall of Fame in November 1992.

Wilson and his brother, Puny, are the only two brothers in the Texas A&M football Hall of Fame. Wilson was the first Aggie in the NFL and won three world championships – one on the NY Giants and two with the Greenbay Packers. The brothers passed down letters from "Curly" Lambeau (Lambeau field), pictures with him and Jim Thorpe, and the game ball from the Dixie Classic – where the 12th Man tradition started. Puny received the game ball in the 12th man game and later coached Dan Rather at Sam Houston State University. Wilson's football history at Texas A&M will never be forgotten. Due to the rich family football history at Texas A&M, Puny's great grandchildren (Haley Peppard, Wilson Peppard, and Ben Peppard) have all carried on the tradition.

In 1980, Wilson was posthumously enshrined in the Texas A&M Hall of Fame.
