= 1949 North Texas State Eagles football team =

American college football season

1949 North Texas State Eagles football
- Conference: Gulf Coast Conference
- Record: 8–4 (2–1 GCC)
- Head coach: Odus Mitchell (4th season)
- Home stadium: Eagle Field

1949 Gulf Coast Conference football standings
	Conf.					Overall
Team	W		L		T	W		L		T
Hardin $	3	–	0	–	0	10	–	1	–	0
North Texas State	2	–	1	–	0	8	–	4	–	0
Houston	1	–	2	–	0	5	–	4	–	1
Trinity (TX)	0	–	3	–	0	6	–	5	–	1
$ – Conference champion

The 1949 North Texas State Eagles football team was an American football team that represented North Texas State College (now known as the University of North Texas) during the 1949 college football season as a member of the Gulf Coast Conference. In their fourth year under head coach Odus Mitchell, the team compiled a 8–4 record.

== Schedule ==
Date	Opponent	Site	Result	Attendance	Source
September 10	at Howard Payne*	Lion Stadium; Brownwood, TX	W 34–14		
September 17	at Hardin–Simmons*	Parramore Field; Abilene, TX	L 7–13	7,500	
September 24	at Arkansas*	War Memorial Stadium; Little Rock, AR	L 19–33	12,500	
September 30	at Oklahoma City*	Taft Stadium; Oklahoma City, OK	W 26–7	5,000	
October 7	Hardin	Eagle Field; Denton, TX	L 17–20	8,000	
October 15	Stephen F. Austin*	Eagle Field; Denton, TX	W 25–6	5,000	
October 22	at Sam Houston State*	Pritchett Field; Huntsville, TX	W 41–14		
October 29	Southwest Texas State*	Eagle Field; Denton, TX	W 41–7		
November 5	at Trinity (TX)	Alamo Stadium; San Antonio, TX	W 32–21		
November 12	Houston^{†}	Eagle Field; Denton, TX	W 28–23	10,000	
November 19	at East Texas State*	Lion Stadium; Commerce, TX	W 59–6	7,500	
November 24	at Nevada*	Mackay Stadium; Reno, NV	L 7–28	4,500	
*Non-conference game; ^{†}Homecoming
