= Midway South, Texas =

- Census-designated place
- Coordinates: 26°9′36″N 98°1′6″W
- Country: United States of America
- State: Texas
- County: Hidalgo

Area
  - Total: 1.2 sq mi (3.2 km^{2})
  - Land: 1.2 sq mi (3.2 km^{2})
  - Water: 0 sq mi (0.0 km^{2})
- Elevation: 79 ft (24 m)

Population (2020)
  - Total: 2,307
  - Density: 1,900/sq mi (720/km^{2})
- Time zone: UTC-6 (Central (CST))
  - Summer (DST): UTC-5 (CDT)
- FIPS code: 48-48280
- GNIS feature ID: 1852737

Midway South is a census-designated place (CDP) in Hidalgo County, Texas, United States. The population was 2,307 at the 2020 United States Census. It is part of the McAllen–Edinburg–Mission Metropolitan Statistical Area.

== Geography ==
Midway South is located at 26°9′36″N 98°1′6″W (26.159984, -98.018322).

According to the United States Census Bureau, the CDP has a total area of 1.2 square miles (3.2 km^{2}), all land.

== Demographics ==
Historical population
Census	Pop.	Note	%±
2000	1,711		—
2010	2,239		30.9%
2020	2,307		3.0%
U.S. Decennial Census; 1850–1900 1910; 1920 1930 1940; 1950 1960 1970; 1980 1990 2000; 2010 2020

Midway South first appeared as a census designated place in the 2000 U.S. census.

=== 2020 census ===
Midway South CDP, Texas – Racial and ethnic composition Note: the US Census treats Hispanic/Latino as an ethnic category. This table excludes Latinos from the racial categories and assigns them to a separate category. Hispanics/Latinos may be of any race.
Race / Ethnicity (NH = Non-Hispanic)	Pop 2000	Pop 2010	Pop 2020	% 2000	% 2010	% 2020
White alone (NH)	71	124	45	4.15%	5.54%	1.95%
Black or African American alone (NH)	0	1	1	0.00%	0.04%	0.04%
Native American or Alaska Native alone (NH)	0	0	2	0.00%	0.00%	0.09%
Asian alone (NH)	0	1	15	0.00%	0.04%	0.65%
Native Hawaiian or Pacific Islander alone (NH)	0	0	0	0.00%	0.00%	0.00%
Other race alone (NH)	0	0	3	0.00%	0.00%	0.13%
Mixed race or Multiracial (NH)	10	0	4	0.58%	0.00%	0.17%
Hispanic or Latino (any race)	1,630	2,113	2,237	95.27%	94.37%	96.97%
Total	1,711	2,239	2,307	100.00%	100.00%	100.00%

As of the census of 2000, there were 1,711 people, 419 households, and 372 families residing in the CDP. The population density was 1,376.3 inhabitants per square mile (531.4/km^{2}). There were 461 housing units at an average density of 370.8 per square mile (143.2/km^{2}). The racial makeup of the CDP was 82.58% White, 0.06% African American, 16.01% from other races, and 1.34% from two or more races. Hispanic or Latino of any race were 95.27% of the population.

There were 419 households, out of which 59.2% had children under the age of 18 living with them, 62.8% were married couples living together, 19.8% had a female householder with no husband present, and 11.0% were non-families. 8.4% of all households were made up of individuals, and 3.6% had someone living alone who was 65 years of age or older. The average household size was 4.07 and the average family size was 4.32.

In the CDP, the population was spread out, with 41.4% under the age of 18, 13.3% from 18 to 24, 25.9% from 25 to 44, 13.6% from 45 to 64, and 5.8% who were 65 years of age or older. The median age was 23 years. For every 100 females, there were 95.5 males. For every 100 females age 18 and over, there were 98.0 males.

The median income for a household in the CDP was $18,657, and the median income for a family was $19,352. Males had a median income of $12,321 versus $15,966 for females. The per capita income for the CDP was $6,591. About 43.6% of families and 50.3% of the population were below the poverty line, including 51.0% of those under age 18 and 42.0% of those age 65 or over.

== Education ==
Much of Midway South (sections east of South Midway Road) is served by the Weslaco Independent School District. Two elementary schools, Sam Houston Elementary School and Memorial Elementary School, serve sections of the WISD portion. All residents are zoned to Central Middle School, and Weslaco High School.

A portion of Midway South (sections west of South Midway Road) is served by the Donna Independent School District (DISD). Stainke Elementary School and Guzman Elementary School serve sections of the DISD portion of Midway South. All portions are zoned by Todd Middle School and Donna High School.

In addition, South Texas Independent School District operates magnet schools that serve the community.
