= Bob Berry (coach) =

American football player and coach (1905–1953)

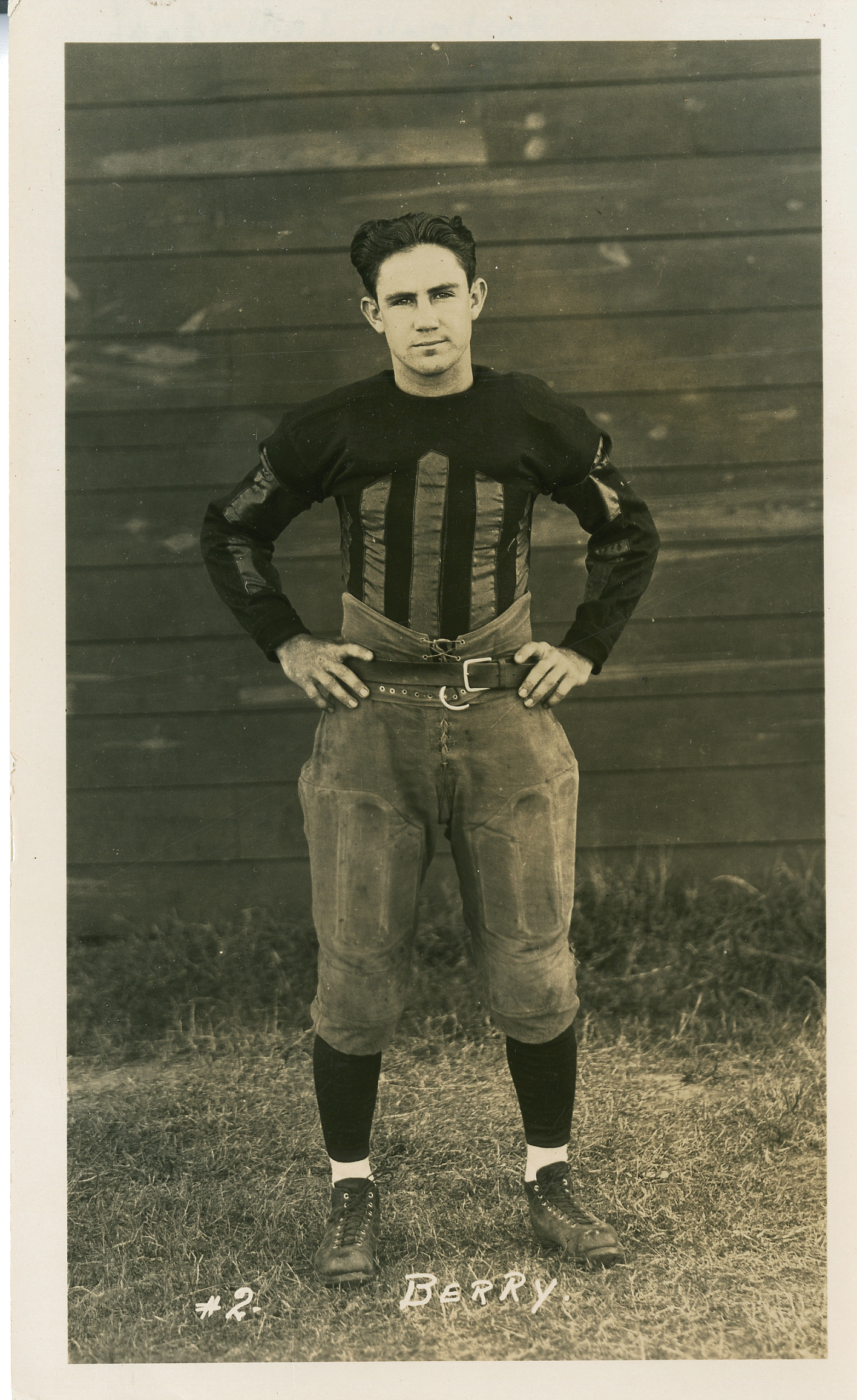
- Berry with Texas A&M

Biographical details
- Born: January 23, 1905
- Died: December 19, 1953 (aged 48); Johnson City, Tennessee, U.S.

Playing career

Football
- 1924–1925: Texas A&M
- Position: Quarterback

Coaching career (HC unless noted)

Football
- 1928–1934: Paris
- 1935–1941: East Texas State
- 1946–1950: East Texas State

Track and field
- ?–1935: Paris
- ?: East Texas State

Administrative career (AD unless noted)
- ?–1951: East Texas State

Head coaching record
- Overall: 72–34–8 (college football)

Accomplishments and honors

Championships
- Football; 4 LSC (1935, 1937–1938, 1949)

Awards
- Second-team All-SWC (1925)

Robert H. Berry (January 23, 1905 – December 19, 1953) was an American college football and track and field coach and athletics administrator. He served two stints as the head football coach at East Texas State Teachers College—now known as East Texas A&M University—from 1935 to 1941 and 1946 to 1950, compiling a record of 72–34–8. Berry was also the track coach and athletic director at East Texas State.

Berry attended Texas A&M University, where he played football as a quarterback in 1924 and 1925 before graduating in 1926. He was a second-team selection by the Associated Press to the 1925 All-Southwest Conference football team. Berry coached football and track at Paris Junior College in Paris, Texas for eight years before he was hired at East Texas State in 1935. Ge resigned from his post at East Texas State in 1951 to go into private business.

Berry moved to Johnson City, Tennessee and operated a dry cleaning business there. He was killed in a fire on December 19, 1953, at his home in Johnson City. He was believed to have died from smoke inhalation.

== Head coaching record ==
=== College football ===
Year	Team	Overall	Conference	Standing	Bowl/playoffs
East Texas State Lions (Lone Star Conference) (1935–1941)
1935	East Texas State	6–2–1	3–1	T–1st	
1936	East Texas State	8–2	3–1	2nd	
1937	East Texas State	8–2	4–0	1st	
1938	East Texas State	8–1	4–0	1st	
1939	East Texas State	7–3	2–2	3rd	
1940	East Texas State	4–4	2–2	3rd	
1941	East Texas State	6–2–1	2–2	3rd	
East Texas State Lions (Lone Star Conference) (1946–1950)
1946	East Texas State	5–2–2	3–1–1	T–2nd	
1947	East Texas State	8–2	4–2	T–2nd	
1948	East Texas State	3–6–1	1–4–1	6th	
1949	East Texas State	5–3–1	3–0	1st	
1950	East Texas State	4–5–2	1–2–1	4th	
East Texas State:		72–34–8	33–17–3		
Total:		72–34–8			
National championship Conference title Conference division title or championship game berth
