= 1949 Houston Cougars football team =

American college football season

1949 Houston Cougars football
- Conference: Gulf Coast Conference
- Record: 5–4–1 (1–2 GCC)
- Head coach: Clyde Lee (2nd season)
- Captains: Aubrey Baker; Cecil Towns
- Home stadium: Public School Stadium

1949 Gulf Coast Conference football standings
	Conf.					Overall
Team	W		L		T	W		L		T
Hardin $	3	–	0	–	0	10	–	1	–	0
North Texas State	2	–	1	–	0	8	–	4	–	0
Houston	1	–	2	–	0	5	–	4	–	1
Trinity (TX)	0	–	3	–	0	6	–	5	–	1
$ – Conference champion

The 1949 Houston Cougars football team was an American football team that represented the University of Houston in the Gulf Coast Conference during the 1949 college football season. In its second season under head coach Clyde Lee, the team compiled a 5–4–1 record (1–2 against conference opponents) and finished in third place in the GCC. Aubrey Baker and Cecil Towns were the team captains. The team played its home games at Public School Stadium in Houston.

== Schedule ==
Date	Time	Opponent	Site	Result	Attendance	Source
September 17		William & Mary*	Public School Stadium; Houston, TX	L 13–14	20,000	
October 1		Wichita*	Public School Stadium; Houston, TX	W 28–6	8,000	
October 8		at Southwestern Louisiana*	McNaspy Stadium; Lafayette, LA	W 28–7		
October 15		West Texas State*	Public School Stadium; Houston, TX	W 14–13	6,000	
October 22		Hardin–Simmons*^{†}	Public School Stadium; Houston, TX	T 27–27	8,000–10,000	
October 29	2:30 p.m.	at Hardin	Coyote Stadium; Wichita Falls, TX	L 21–33	12,500	
November 5		at St. Bonaventure*	Forness Stadium; Olean, NY	L 14–20	5,000	
November 12		at North Texas State	Eagle Field; Denton, TX	L 23–28	10,000	
November 19		Trinity (TX)	Public School Stadium; Houston, TX	W 28–21	7,500	
November 24		at Saint Louis*	Walsh Stadium; St. Louis, MO	W 35–0	6,387–6,823	
*Non-conference game; ^{†}Homecoming; All times are in Central time
