= 1947 Sam Houston State Bearkats football team =

American college football season

1947 Sam Houston State Bearkats football
- Conference: Lone Star Conference
- Record: 3–6 (1–5 LSC)
- Head coach: Puny Wilson (7th season)
- Home stadium: Pritchett Field

1947 Lone Star Conference football standings
	Conf.					Overall
Team	W		L		T	W		L		T
North Texas State $	6	–	0	–	0	10	–	2	–	0
East Texas State	4	–	2	–	0	8	–	2	–	0
Southwest Texas State	4	–	2	–	0	5	–	4	–	0
Trinity (TX)	3	–	2	–	1	5	–	3	–	2
Stephen F. Austin	2	–	3	–	1	3	–	6	–	1
Sam Houston State	1	–	5	–	0	3	–	6	–	0
Houston	0	–	6	–	0	3	–	8	–	0
$ – Conference champion

The 1947 Sam Houston State Bearkats football team represented Sam Houston State Teachers College (now known as Sam Houston State University) as a member of the Lone Star Conference (LSC) during the 1947 college football season. Led by seventh-year head coach Puny Wilson, the Bearkats compiled an overall record of 3–6 with a mark of 1–5 in conference play, and finished sixth in the LSC.

In the final Litkenhous Ratings released in mid-December, Sam Houston was ranked at No. 228 out of 500 college football teams.

== Schedule ==
Date	Opponent	Site	Result	Attendance	Source
September 19	Louisiana College*	Pritchett Field; Huntsville, TX	W 14–0		
September 27	at Texas A&I*	Kingsville, TX	L 7–28		
October 3	Austin*	Pritchett Field; Huntsville, TX	W 12–0		
October 18	at Trinity (TX)	Alamo Stadium; San Antonio, TX	L 6–27	4,013	
October 25	North Texas State	Pritchett Field; Huntsville, TX	L 0–27		
October 31	East Texas State	Pritchett Field; Huntsville, TX	L 6–28		
November 15	at Southwest Texas State	Evans Field; San Marcos, TX (rivalry)	L 6–7		
November 22	at Stephen F. Austin	Memorial Stadium; Nacogdoches, TX (rivalry)	L 0–13		
November 27	Houston	Pritchett Field; Huntsville, TX	W 23–0		
*Non-conference game
