= 1947 Southwest Texas State Bobcats football team =

American college football season

1947 Southwest Texas State Bobcats football
- Conference: Lone Star Conference
- Record: 5–4 (4–1 LSC)
- Head coach: George Vest (2nd season)
- Home stadium: Evans Field

1947 Lone Star Conference football standings
	Conf.					Overall
Team	W		L		T	W		L		T
North Texas State $	6	–	0	–	0	10	–	2	–	0
East Texas State	4	–	2	–	0	8	–	2	–	0
Southwest Texas State	4	–	2	–	0	5	–	4	–	0
Trinity (TX)	3	–	2	–	1	5	–	3	–	2
Stephen F. Austin	2	–	3	–	1	3	–	6	–	1
Sam Houston State	1	–	5	–	0	3	–	6	–	0
Houston	0	–	6	–	0	3	–	8	–	0
$ – Conference champion

The 1947 Southwest Texas State Bobcats football team was an American football team that represented Southwest Texas State Teachers College (now known as Texas State University) during the 1947 college football season as a member of the Lone Star Conference (LSC). In their second year under head coach George Vest, the team compiled an overall record of 5–4 with a mark of 4–1 in conference play.

In the final Litkenhous Ratings released in mid-December, Southwest Texas was ranked at No. 139 out of 500 college football teams.

== Schedule ==
Date	Opponent	Site	Result	Attendance	Source
September 20	at Abilene Christian*	Fair Fark Stadium; Abilene, TX	L 13–19	3,500	
September 27	Trinity (TX)	Evans Field; San Marcos, TX	L 13–14		
October 4	Texas A&I*	Evans Field; San Marcos, TX	L 13–19		
October 11	Howard Payne*	Evans Field; San Marcos, TX	W 20–0		
October 25	at Stephen F. Austin	Birdwell Field; Nacogdoches, TX	W 20–0		
November 1	at North Texas State	Eagle Field; Denton, TX	L 7–27	6,000	
November 8	East Texas State	Evans Field; San Marcos, TX	W 20–7	4,000	
November 15	Sam Houston State	Evans Field; San Marcos, TX (rivalry)	W 7–6		
November 22	at Houston	Public School Stadium; Houston, TX	W 2–0		
*Non-conference game
