= 1941 Southwest Texas State Bobcats football team =

American college football season

1941 Southwest Texas State Bobcats football
- Conference: Lone Star Conference
- Record: 4–4 (3–1 LSC)
- Head coach: Joe Bailey Cheaney (7th season)
- Home stadium: Evans Field

1941 Lone Star Conference football standings
	Conf.					Overall
Team	W		L		T	W		L		T
North Texas State $	4	–	0	–	0	7	–	1	–	0
Southwest Texas State	3	–	1	–	0	4	–	4	–	0
East Texas State	2	–	2	–	0	6	–	2	–	1
Sam Houston State	1	–	3	–	0	2	–	7	–	1
Stephen F. Austin	0	–	4	–	0	1	–	6	–	1
$ – Conference champion

The 1941 Southwest Texas State Bobcats football team was an American football team that represented Southwest Texas State Teachers College (now known as Texas State University) during the 1941 college football season as a member of the Lone Star Conference (LSC). In their seventh year under head coach Joe Bailey Cheaney, the team compiled an overall record of 4–4 with a mark of 3–1 in conference play.

Southwest Texas was ranked at No. 184 (out of 681 teams) in the final rankings under the Litkenhous Difference by Score System.

== Schedule ==
Date	Opponent	Site	Result	Source
September 26	at Howard Payne*	Brownwood, TX	L 0–14	
October 3	Schreiner*	Evans Field; San Marcos, TX	L 0–7	
October 10	at Southwestern (TX)*	Snyder Field; Georgetown, TX	W 7–6	
October 17	Texas A&I*	Evans Field; San Marcos, TX	L 6–14	
October 24	Stephen F. Austin	Evans Field; San Marcos, TX	W 27–0	
November 1	North Texas State	Evans Field; San Marcos, TX	L 6–10	
November 8	at East Texas State	East Texas Stadium; Commerce, TX	W 6–0	
November 15	at Sam Houston State	Pritchett Field; Huntsville, TX (rivalry)	W 29–7	
*Non-conference game
