= 1938 North Texas State Teachers Eagles football team =

American college football season

1938 North Texas State Teachers Eagles football
- Conference: Lone Star Conference
- Record: 7–4 (2–2 LSC)
- Head coach: Jack Sisco (10th season)
- Home stadium: Eagle Field

1938 Lone Star Conference football standings
| | Conf. | | | | | Overall |
| Team | W | | L | | T | W | | L | | T |
|---|---|---|---|---|---|---|---|---|---|---|
| East Texas State $ | 4 | – | 0 | – | 0 | 8 | – | 1 | – | 0 |
| Sam Houston State | 3 | – | 1 | – | 0 | 8 | – | 2 | – | 0 |
| North Texas State | 2 | – | 2 | – | 0 | 7 | – | 4 | – | 0 |
| Stephen F. Austin | 1 | – | 3 | – | 0 | 3 | – | 5 | – | 1 |
| Southwest Texas State | 0 | – | 4 | – | 0 | 0 | – | 8 | – | 0 |
$ – Conference champion

The 1938 North Texas State Teachers Eagles football team was an American football team that represented the North Texas State Teachers College (now known as the University of North Texas) during the 1938 college football season as a member of the Lone Star Conference. In their tenth year under head coach Jack Sisco, the team compiled a 7–4 record.

== Schedule ==
| Date | Opponent | Site | Result | Attendance | Source |
|---|---|---|---|---|---|
| September 16 | at Howard Payne* | Brownwood, TX | W 13–0 | 3,500 | |
| September 24 | at SMU* | Ownby Stadium; University Park, TX (rivalry) | L 7–34 | | |
| October 1 | at Southwestern (TX)* | Georgetown, TX | W 27–6 | | |
| October 8 | vs. Abilene Christian* | San Angelo, TX | L 0–6 | | |
| October 14 | McMurry* | Eagle Field; Denton, TX | W 46–7 | | |
| October 21 | Stephen F. Austin | Eagle Field; Denton, TX | W 27–6 | | |
| October 28 | at Sam Houston State | Pritchett Field; Huntsville, TX | L 0–18 | | |
| November 5 | Southwest Texas State | Eagle Field; Denton, TX | W 7–6 | | |
| November 11 | at Austin* | Sherman, TX | W 32–2 | | |
| November 19 | at East Texas State | Commerce, TX | L 3–7 | | |
| December 2 | Pittsburg Teachers* | Eagle Field; Denton, TX | W 28–0 | | |
*Non-conference game
