= 1949 Southwest Texas State Bobcats football team =

American college football season

1949 Southwest Texas State Bobcats football
- Conference: Lone Star Conference
- Record: 3–6–1 (1–2 LSC)
- Head coach: George Vest (4th season)
- Home stadium: Evans Field

1949 Lone Star Conference football standings
	Conf.					Overall
Team	W		L		T	W		L		T
East Texas State $	3	–	0	–	0	5	–	3	–	1
Stephen F. Austin	2	–	1	–	0	7	–	2	–	0
Southwest Texas State	1	–	2	–	0	3	–	6	–	1
Sam Houston State	0	–	3	–	0	3	–	7	–	0
$ – Conference champion

The 1949 Southwest Texas State Bobcats football team was an American football team that represented Southwest Texas State Teachers College (now known as Texas State University) during the 1949 college football season as a member of the Lone Star Conference (LSC). In their fourth year under head coach George Vest, the team compiled an overall record of 3–6–1 with a mark of 0–3 in conference play.

== Schedule ==
Date	Opponent	Site	Result	Attendance	Source
September 17	at Southwestern (TX)*	Snyder Field; Georgetown, TX	T 0–0	3,000	
September 24	Trinity (TX)*	Evans Field; San Marcos, TX	W 20–6		
October 1	Texas A&I*	Evans Field; San Marcos, TX	L 12–20		
October 8	Howard Payne*	Evans Field; San Marcos, TX	L 3–6		
October 15	at Hardin*	Coyote Stadium; Wichita Falls, TX	L 6–19		
October 22	at Stephen F. Austin	Birdwell Field; Nacogdoches, TX	L 20–23		
October 29	at North Texas State*	Eagle Field; Denton, TX	L 7–41		
November 5	East Texas State	Evans Field; San Marcos, TX	L 6–13	5,000	
November 12	Sam Houston State	Evans Field; San Marcos, TX (rivalry)	W 19–14		
November 18	at East Texas Baptist*	Maverick Stadium; Marshall, TX	W 31–26	1,500	
*Non-conference game
