= 1949 Hardin Indians football team =

American college football season

1949 Hardin Indians football

GCC champion
- Conference: Gulf Coast Conference
- Record: 10–1 (3–0 GCC)
- Head coach: Billy Stamps (2nd season)
- Home stadium: Coyote Stadium

1949 Gulf Coast Conference football standings
	Conf.					Overall
Team	W		L		T	W		L		T
Hardin $	3	–	0	–	0	10	–	1	–	0
North Texas State	2	–	1	–	0	8	–	4	–	0
Houston	1	–	2	–	0	5	–	4	–	1
Trinity (TX)	0	–	3	–	0	6	–	5	–	1
$ – Conference champion

The 1949 Hardin Indians football team was an American football team that represented Hardin College—now known as Midwestern State University–as a member of the Gulf Coast Conference (GCC) during the 1949 college football season. Led by second-year head coach Billy Stamps, the Indians compiled an overall record of 10–1 with a mark of 3–0 in conference play, winning the GCC title. Hardin played home games at Coyote Stadium in Wichita Falls, Texas.

== Schedule ==
Date	Time	Opponent	Site	Result	Attendance	Source
September 10		Eastern New Mexico*	Coyote Stadium; Wichita Falls, TX	W 45–0	6,000	
September 17		Daniel Baker*	Wichita Falls, TX	W 40–0		
September 24		at Arkansas Tech*	Russellville, AR	W 33–0		
October 1		vs. Austin*	Childress, TX	W 28–0		
October 7		at North Texas State	Eagle Field; Denton, TX	W 20–17	8,000	
October 15	8:00 p.m.	Southwest Texas State*	Coyote Stadium; Wichita Falls, TX	W 19–6		
October 22		at East Texas State*	Commerce, TX	L 13–25		
October 29	2:30 p.m.	Houston^{†}	Coyote Stadium; Wichita Falls, TX	W 33–21	12,500	
November 5		at Sam Houston State*	Huntsville, TX	W 21–13		
November 11	2:30 p.m.	Oklahoma City*	Wichita Falls, TX	W 60–16	6,500	
November 24		Trinity (TX)	Wichita Falls, TX	W 53–0		
*Non-conference game; ^{†}Homecoming; All times are in Central time
