= 1938 East Texas State Lions football team =

American college football season

1938 East Texas State Lions football

LSC champion
- Conference: Lone Star Conference
- Record: 8–1 (4–0 LSC)
- Head coach: Bob Berry (4th season)

1938 Lone Star Conference football standings
	Conf.					Overall
Team	W		L		T	W		L		T
East Texas State $	4	–	0	–	0	8	–	1	–	0
Sam Houston State	3	–	1	–	0	8	–	2	–	0
North Texas State	2	–	2	–	0	7	–	4	–	0
Stephen F. Austin	1	–	3	–	0	3	–	5	–	1
Southwest Texas State	0	–	4	–	0	0	–	8	–	0
$ – Conference champion

The 1938 East Texas State Lions football team represented East Texas State Teachers College—now known as East Texas A&M University–as a member of the Lone Star Conference (LSC) during the 1938 college football season. Led by fourth-year head coach Bob Berry, the Lions compiled an overall record of 8–1 with a mark of 4–0 in conference play, winning the LSC title.

== Schedule ==
Date	Time	Opponent	Site	Result	Attendance	Source
September 23	3:15 p.m.	at Louisiana Normal*	Demon Field; Natchitoches, LA	W 14–0	4,000	
September 30		West Texas State*	Commerce, TX	W 21–20		
October 14		Stephen F. Austin	Commerce, TX	W 7–6	4,500	
October 21	3:00 p.m.	at Trinity (TX)*	Yoakum Field; Waxahachie, TX	W 26–6		
October 29		at Hardin–Simmons*	Parramore Field; Abilene, TX	L 6–27		
November 4		Sam Houston State	Commerce, TX	W 14–6		
November 11		at Southwest Texas State	Evans Field; San Marcos, TX	W 27–7		
November 19		North Texas State Teachers	Commerce, TX	W 7–3		
November 24		Kirksville*	Commerce, TX	W 53–0		
*Non-conference game; All times are in Central time
