= Midway North, Texas =

- Census-designated place
- Coordinates: 26°11′9″N 98°1′1″W
- Country: United States of America
- State: Texas
- County: Hidalgo

Area
  - Total: 2.1 sq mi (5.4 km^{2})
  - Land: 2.1 sq mi (5.4 km^{2})
  - Water: 0 sq mi (0.0 km^{2})
- Elevation: 79 ft (24 m)

Population (2020)
  - Total: 4,232
  - Density: 2,000/sq mi (780/km^{2})
- Time zone: UTC-6 (Central (CST))
  - Summer (DST): UTC-5 (CDT)
- FIPS code: 48-48272
- GNIS feature ID: 1852736

Midway North is a census-designated place (CDP) in Hidalgo County, Texas, United States. The population was 4,232 at the 2020 United States Census. It is part of the McAllen–Edinburg–Mission Metropolitan Statistical Area.

== Geography ==
Midway North is located at 26°11′9″N 98°1′1″W (26.185737, -98.016852).

According to the United States Census Bureau, the CDP has a total area of 2.1 square miles (5.4 km^{2}), all land.

== Demographics ==
Historical population
Census	Pop.	Note	%±
2000	3,946		—
2010	4,752		20.4%
2020	4,232		−10.9%
U.S. Decennial Census; 1850–1900 1910; 1920 1930 1940; 1950 1960 1970; 1980 1990 2000; 2010 2020

Midway North first appeared as a census designated place in the 2000 U.S. census.

=== Racial and ethnic composition ===
Midway North CDP, Texas – Racial and ethnic composition Note: the US Census treats Hispanic/Latino as an ethnic category. This table excludes Latinos from the racial categories and assigns them to a separate category. Hispanics/Latinos may be of any race.
Race / Ethnicity (NH = Non-Hispanic)	Pop 2000	Pop 2010	Pop 2020	% 2000	% 2010	% 2020
White alone (NH)	35	54	52	0.89%	1.14%	1.23%
Black or African American alone (NH)	3	9	2	0.08%	0.19%	0.05%
Native American or Alaska Native alone (NH)	0	2	1	0.00%	0.04%	0.02%
Asian alone (NH)	0	0	0	0.00%	0.00%	0.00%
Native Hawaiian or Pacific Islander alone (NH)	0	0	0	0.00%	0.00%	0.00%
Other race alone (NH)	0	1	7	0.00%	0.02%	0.17%
Mixed race or Multiracial (NH)	3	2	5	0.08%	0.04%	0.12%
Hispanic or Latino (any race)	3,905	4,684	4,165	98.96%	98.57%	98.42%
Total	3,946	4,752	4,232	100.00%	100.00%	100.00%

=== 2020 census ===
As of the 2020 census, Midway North had a population of 4,232. The median age was 29.8 years. 29.5% of residents were under the age of 18 and 9.0% of residents were 65 years of age or older. For every 100 females there were 99.6 males, and for every 100 females age 18 and over there were 98.6 males age 18 and over.

100.0% of residents lived in urban areas, while 0.0% lived in rural areas.

There were 1,082 households in Midway North, of which 47.0% had children under the age of 18 living in them. Of all households, 60.7% were married-couple households, 12.7% were households with a male householder and no spouse or partner present, and 22.0% were households with a female householder and no spouse or partner present. About 11.0% of all households were made up of individuals and 5.3% had someone living alone who was 65 years of age or older.

There were 1,156 housing units, of which 6.4% were vacant. The homeowner vacancy rate was 1.0% and the rental vacancy rate was 4.7%.

=== 2000 census ===
As of the 2000 census, there were 3,946 people, 834 households, and 783 families residing in the CDP. The population density was 1,908.7 inhabitants per square mile (737.0/km^{2}). There were 902 housing units at an average density of 436.3 per square mile (168.5/km^{2}). The racial makeup of the CDP was 88.70% White, 0.15% African American, 0.18% Native American, 9.96% from other races, and 1.01% from two or more races. Hispanic or Latino of any race were 98.96% of the population.

There were 834 households, out of which 68.6% had children under the age of 18 living with them, 77.6% were married couples living together, 13.2% had a female householder with no husband present, and 6.0% were non-families. 4.2% of all households were made up of individuals, and 1.4% had someone living alone who was 65 years of age or older. The average household size was 4.73 and the average family size was 4.88.

In the CDP, the population was spread out, with 42.8% under the age of 18, 13.9% from 18 to 24, 27.3% from 25 to 44, 12.3% from 45 to 64, and 3.7% who were 65 years of age or older. The median age was 21 years. For every 100 females, there were 101.6 males. For every 100 females age 18 and over, there were 98.1 males.

The median income for a household in the CDP was $21,849, and the median income for a family was $22,529. Males had a median income of $17,028 versus $12,162 for females. The per capita income for the CDP was $5,202. About 43.4% of families and 43.9% of the population were below the poverty line, including 50.4% of those under age 18 and 49.0% of those age 65 or over.

== Education ==
Much of Midway North (sections east of Midway Road) is served by the Weslaco Independent School District. Two elementary schools, Cleckler-Heald Elementary School and "Rudy" Silva Elementary School, serve sections of the WISD portion. All residents are zoned to Beatriz Garza Middle School, and Weslaco High School.

A portion of Midway North (sections west of Midway Road) is served by the Donna Independent School District (DISD). Residents are zoned to Price Elementary School, Todd Middle School, and Donna High School.

In addition, South Texas Independent School District operates magnet schools that serve the community.
