= 1925 All-Southwest Conference football team =

American football team

The 1925 All-Southwest Conference football team consists of American football players chosen by various organizations for All-Southwest Conference teams for the 1925 college football season.

== All Southwest selections ==
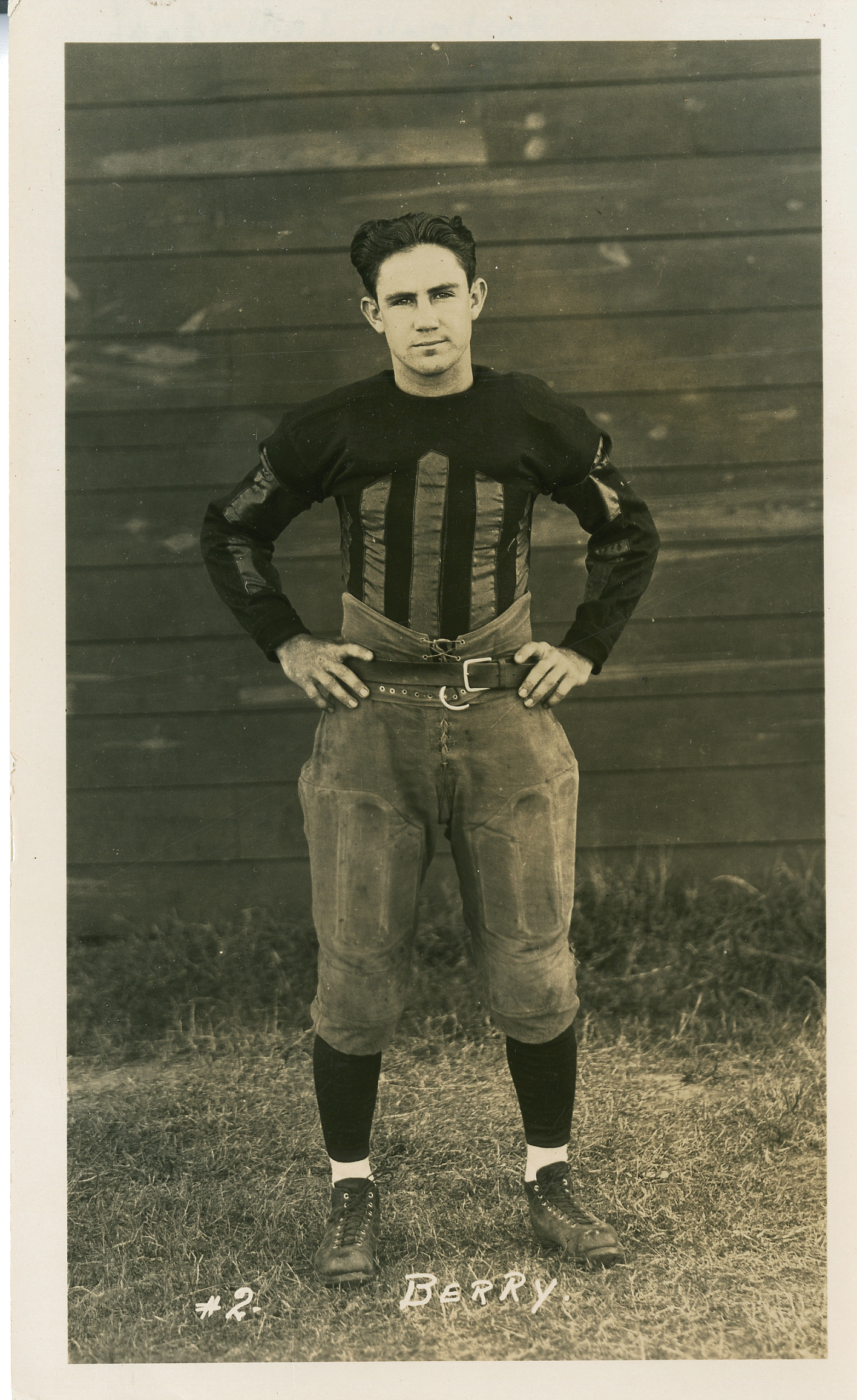
R.H. "Bob" Berry

=== Quarterbacks ===
- Herman Clark, TCU (AP-1, JH, JT)
- Bob Berry, Texas A&M (AP-2)

=== Halfbacks ===
- Mack Saxon, Texas (AP-1, JH, JT)
- Joel Hunt, Texas A&M (AP-1, JT)
- Chris Cortemeglia, SMU (JH)
- Edward W. Herting Jr., Rice (AP-2)
- Jack Jones, Baylor (AP-2)

=== Fullbacks ===
- Mule Wilson, Texas A&M (AP-1, JH, JT)
- King, Texas (AP-2)

=== Ends ===
- Earl Key, SMU (AP-1, JH, JT)
- Matthew Newell, Texas (AP-1, JH)
- Rags Matthews, TCU (AP-2, JT)
- Curtis Parker, Arkansas (AP-2)

=== Tackles ===
- Harold "Tubby" Brewster, TCU (AP-1, JH, JT)
- L.G. Dieterich, Texas A&M (AP-1, JH, JT)
- Clem "Ox" Higgins, Texas (AP-2)
- Watters, SMU (AP-2)

=== Guards ===
- Brockman, Oklahoma (JH)
- W.M. Dansby, Texas A&M (AP-1, JH, JT)
- Homer Walker, Baylor (AP-2, JT)
- Vaughn, SMU (AP-2)

=== Centers ===
- Wash Underwood, Rice (AP-1 [g], JH, JT)
- H. C. Pfannkuche, Texas (AP-1)
- Johnny Washmon, TCU (AP-2)

== Key ==
- AP = Associated Press, based on selections by sports writers, Southwest Conference coaches, and numerous officials
- JH = John Heisman, head coach at Rice
- JT = Jinx Tucker

== See also ==
- 1925 College Football All-America Team
