= Jewell Wallace =

American football player and coach (1907–1999)

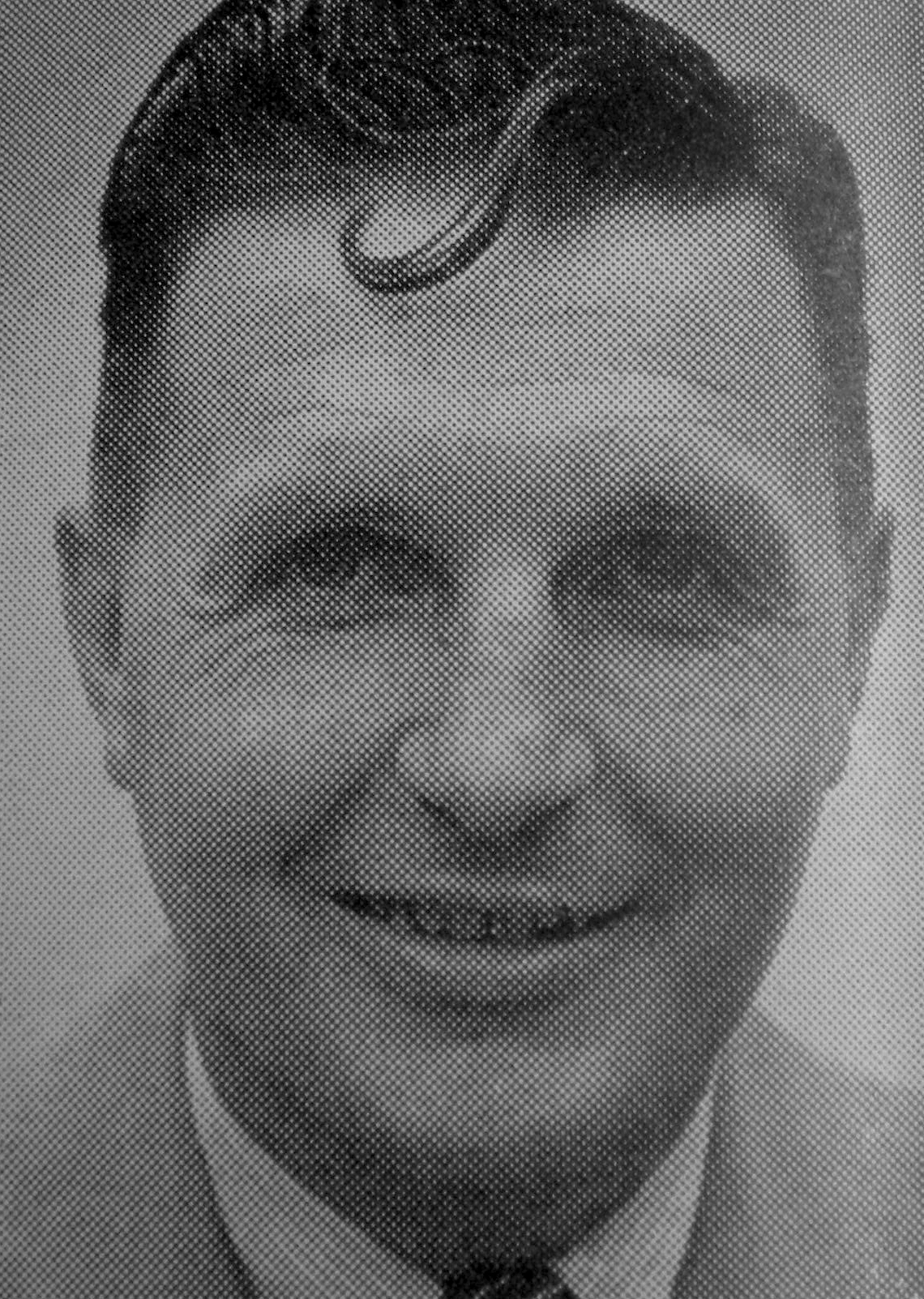
- Wallace, c. 1946

Biographical details
- Born: June 16, 1907; Carrollton, Missouri, U.S
- Died: April 7, 1999 (aged 91); Fort Collins, Colorado, U.S

Playing career
- 1932–1933: TCU

Coaching career (HC unless noted)
- 1943–1945: San Angelo HS (TX)
- 1946–1947: Houston
- 1948–1953: Jefferson HS (TX)

Head coaching record
- Overall: 7–14 (college)

William Jewell Wallace (June 16, 1907 – April 7, 1999) was an American football player and coach. He served as the head football coach at the University of Houston in its first two football seasons, 1946 and 1947, guiding the Cougars to a 7–14 record. Wallace was a 1934 graduate of Texas Christian University. He began his coaching career at the high school ranks and coached at El Paso Bowie, El Paso, Greenville, San Angelo and Thomas Jefferson High School in San Antonio, Texas.

Wallace died on April 7, 1999, in Fort Collins, Colorado.

== Head coaching record ==
=== College ===
Year	Team	Overall	Conference	Standing
Houston Cougars (Lone Star Conference) (1946–1947)
1946	Houston	4–6	1–4	5th
1947	Houston	3–8	0–6	7th
Houston:		7–14	1–10	
Total:		7–14		
