= 1949 Sam Houston State Bearkats football team =

American college football season

1949 Sam Houston State Bearkats football
- Conference: Lone Star Conference
- Record: 3–7 (0–3 LSC)
- Head coach: Puny Wilson (9th season)
- Home stadium: Pritchett Field

1949 Lone Star Conference football standings
	Conf.					Overall
Team	W		L		T	W		L		T
East Texas State $	3	–	0	–	0	5	–	3	–	1
Stephen F. Austin	2	–	1	–	0	7	–	2	–	0
Southwest Texas State	1	–	2	–	0	3	–	6	–	1
Sam Houston State	0	–	3	–	0	3	–	7	–	0
$ – Conference champion

The 1949 Sam Houston State Bearkats football team represented Sam Houston State Teachers College (now known as Sam Houston State University) as a member of the Lone Star Conference (LSC) during the 1949 college football season. Led by ninth-year head coach Puny Wilson, the Bearkats compiled an overall record of 3–7 with a mark of 0–3 in conference play, and finished fourth in the LSC.

== Schedule ==
Date	Opponent	Site	Result	Attendance	Source
September 17	at Sul Ross*	Jackson Field; Alpine, TX	L 20–31		
September 24	Southwestern (TX)*	Pritchett Field; Huntsville, TX	W 6–0		
October 1	East Texas Baptist*	Pritchett Field; Huntsville, TX	W 26–0		
October 8	at Texas A&I*	Kingsville, TX	L 12–16		
October 15	Brooke Army Medical Center*	Pritchett Field; Huntsville, TX	W 83–0		
October 22	North Texas State*	Pritchett Field; Huntsville, TX	L 14–41		
October 29	East Texas State^{†}	Pritchett Field; Huntsville, TX	L 13–20	6,000	
November 5	Hardin*	Pritchett Field; Huntsville, TX	L 13–21		
November 12	at Southwest Texas State	Evans Field; San Marcos, TX (rivalry)	L 14–19		
November 19	at Stephen F. Austin	Memorial Stadium; Nacogdoches, TX (rivalry)	L 14–51	5,500	
*Non-conference game; ^{†}Homecoming
