= 1941 Sam Houston State Bearkats football team =

American college football season

1941 Sam Houston State Bearkats football
- Conference: Lone Star Conference
- Record: 2–7–1 (1–3 LSC)
- Head coach: Puny Wilson (4th season)
- Home stadium: Pritchett Field

1941 Lone Star Conference football standings
| | Conf. | | | | | Overall |
| Team | W | | L | | T | W | | L | | T |
|---|---|---|---|---|---|---|---|---|---|---|
| North Texas State $ | 4 | – | 0 | – | 0 | 7 | – | 1 | – | 0 |
| Southwest Texas State | 3 | – | 1 | – | 0 | 4 | – | 4 | – | 0 |
| East Texas State | 2 | – | 2 | – | 0 | 6 | – | 2 | – | 1 |
| Sam Houston State | 1 | – | 3 | – | 0 | 2 | – | 7 | – | 1 |
| Stephen F. Austin | 0 | – | 4 | – | 0 | 1 | – | 6 | – | 1 |
$ – Conference champion

The 1941 Sam Houston State Bearkats football team represented Sam Houston State Teachers College (now known as Sam Houston State University) as a member of the Lone Star Conference (LSC) during the 1941 college football season. Led by fourth-year head coach Puny Wilson, the Bearkats compiled an overall record of 2–7–1 with a mark of 1–3 in conference play, and finished fourth in the LSC.

== Schedule ==
| Date | Opponent | Site | Result | Attendance | Source |
|---|---|---|---|---|---|
| September 18 | at Lamar* | Greenie Stadium; Beaumont, TX | W 51–6 | | |
| September 27 | at Texas A&M* | Kyle Field; College Station, TX | L 0–54 | 10,000 | |
| October 4 | at Rice* | Rice Field; Houston, TX | L 0–42 | 14,000 | |
| October 11 | at Texas A&I* | Kingsville, TX | L 7–46 | 9,000 | |
| October 18 | St. Mary's (TX)* | Pritchett Field; Huntsville, TX | T 0–0 | | |
| October 24 | at North Texas State | Eagle Field; Denton, TX | L 0–19 | | |
| November 1 | East Texas State | Pritchett Field; Huntsville, TX | L 7–20 | 5,000 | |
| November 9 | Southwestern Tech (OK)* | Pritchett Field; Huntsville, TX | L 6–19 | | |
| November 15 | Southwest Texas State | Pritchett Field; Huntsville, TX (rivalry) | L 7–29 | | |
| November 20 | at Stephen F. Austin | Birdwell Field; Nacogdoches, TX (rivalry) | W 20–13 | | |
*Non-conference game
