= 1947 Houston Cougars football team =

American college football season

1947 Houston Cougars football
- Conference: Lone Star Conference
- Record: 3–8 (0–6 LSC)
- Head coach: Jewell Wallace (2nd season)
- Captains: Boyd Tingle; Evan Weaver
- Home stadium: Public School Stadium

1947 Lone Star Conference football standings
	Conf.					Overall
Team	W		L		T	W		L		T
North Texas State $	6	–	0	–	0	10	–	2	–	0
East Texas State	4	–	2	–	0	8	–	2	–	0
Southwest Texas State	4	–	2	–	0	5	–	4	–	0
Trinity (TX)	3	–	2	–	1	5	–	3	–	2
Stephen F. Austin	2	–	3	–	1	3	–	6	–	1
Sam Houston State	1	–	5	–	0	3	–	6	–	0
Houston	0	–	6	–	0	3	–	8	–	0
$ – Conference champion

The 1947 Houston Cougars football team was an American football team that represented the University of Houston during the 1947 college football season as a member of the Lone Star Conference (LSC). In its second season under head coach Jewell Wallace, the team compiled a 3–8 record (0–6 against LSC opponents) and finished in the last place in the conference. The team played its home games at Public School Stadium in Houston.

In the final Litkenhous Ratings released in mid-December, Houston was ranked at No. 264 out of 500 college football teams.

== Schedule ==
Date	Opponent	Site	Result	Attendance	Source
September 20	Centenary*	Public School Stadium; Houston, TX	W 19–7	7,000	
September 27	McMurry*	Public School Stadium; Houston, TX	W 14–13	5,000	
October 4	Daniel Baker*	Public School Stadium; Houston, TX	W 35–12	4,000	
October 11	at Texas A&I	Kingsville, TX	L 0–13	7,000	
October 18	East Texas State*	Public School Stadium; Houston, TX	L 7–33	6,000	
October 25	Trinity (TX)*	Public School Stadium; Houston, TX	L 0–20	4,500	
November 1	at Hardin–Simmons*	Buccaneer Stadium; Corpus Christi, TX	L 7–33	10,000	
November 8	at Stephen F. Austin	Memorial Stadium; Nacogdoches, TX	L 14–25	3,900	
November 15	at North Texas State	Eagle Stadium; Denton, TX	L 0–33	10,000	
November 22	Southwest Texas State^{†}	Public School Stadium; Houston, TX	L 0–2		
November 27	at Sam Houston State	Pritchett Field; Huntsville, TX	L 0–23		
*Non-conference game; ^{†}Homecoming
