= Donna North High School =

Public school in Texas, United States

Coordinates: 26.2253°N 98.0768°W

Location
- 7250 North Val Verde Road; Donna, (Hidalgo County), Texas 78537; United States

Information
- Type: Public high school
- Principal: Sara Pérez
- Staff: 140.57 (FTE)
- Enrollment: 1,996 (2023-2024)
- Student to teacher ratio: 14.20
- Colors: Maroon, black, and gray
- Nickname: Chiefs
- Website: donnanorth.donnaisd.net/o/donnanorth

Donna North High School (DNHS) is a senior high school in the northern district of Donna, Texas. It is a part of the Donna Independent School District.

Places in its attendance boundary include: Muniz, and small sections of Donna and Alamo.
