= 1941 East Texas State Lions football team =

American college football season

1941 East Texas State Lions football
- Conference: Lone Star Conference
- Record: 6–2–1 (2–2 LSC)
- Head coach: Bob Berry (7th season)
- Home stadium: East Texas Stadium

1941 Lone Star Conference football standings
| | Conf. | | | | | Overall |
| Team | W | | L | | T | W | | L | | T |
|---|---|---|---|---|---|---|---|---|---|---|
| North Texas State $ | 4 | – | 0 | – | 0 | 7 | – | 1 | – | 0 |
| Southwest Texas State | 3 | – | 1 | – | 0 | 4 | – | 4 | – | 0 |
| East Texas State | 2 | – | 2 | – | 0 | 6 | – | 2 | – | 1 |
| Sam Houston State | 1 | – | 3 | – | 0 | 2 | – | 7 | – | 1 |
| Stephen F. Austin | 0 | – | 4 | – | 0 | 1 | – | 6 | – | 1 |
$ – Conference champion

The 1941 East Texas State Lions football team represented the East Texas State Teachers College (later renamed East Texas A&M University) as a member of the Lone Star Conference (LSC) during the 1941 college football season. In their seventh season under head coach Bob Berry, the Lions compiled a 6–2–1 record (2–2 against conference opponents) and finished third in the Lone Star Conference.

East Texas was ranked at No. 164 (out of 681 teams) in the final rankings under the Litkenhous Difference by Score System.

The team played its home games at East Texas Stadium in Commerce, Texas.

== Schedule ==
| Date | Opponent | Site | Result | Attendance | Source |
|---|---|---|---|---|---|
| September 20 | Austin* | East Texas Stadium; Commerce, TX | W 30–0 | | |
| September 27 | Abilene Christian* | East Texas Stadium; Commerce, TX | W 35–0 | | |
| October 4 | Howard Payne* | East Texas Stadium; Commerce, TX | T 7–7 | | |
| October 11 | Stephen F. Austin | East Texas Stadium; Commerce, TX | W 20–0 | | |
| October 18 | Texas Wesleyan* | East Texas Stadium; Commerce, TX | W 6–0 | | |
| October 25 | Ouachita Arkansas Teachers* | East Texas Stadium; Commerce, TX | W 14–0 | | |
| November 1 | at Sam Houston State | Huntsville, TX | W 20–7 | 5,000 | |
| November 8 | Southwest Texas State | East Texas Stadium; Commerce, TX | L 0–6 | | |
| November 15 | at North Texas State | Eagle Field; Denton, TX | L 8–15 | 8,000 | |
*Non-conference game
