= Salad Bowl (game) =

Annual NCAA football game

The Salad Bowl was an annual post-season American college football bowl game played at Montgomery Stadium in Phoenix, Arizona, from 1947 to 1955. The bowl was sponsored by the Phoenix and Valley of the Sun Kiwanis Clubs. The bowl stopped inviting college teams in 1952; the 1953 and 1954 games were played among service teams. It was an all-star game in both January and December 1955.

== Game results ==
Date played	Winning team		Losing team		Notes
January 1, 1948	Nevada	13	North Texas State	6	notes
January 1, 1949	Drake	14	Arizona	13	notes
January 2, 1950	Xavier	33	Arizona State	21	notes
January 1, 1951	Miami (OH)	34	Arizona State	21	notes
January 1, 1952	Houston	26	Dayton	21	notes
January 1, 1953	San Diego NTC	81	Camp Breckinridge	20	notes
January 1, 1954	Fort Ord	67	Great Lakes NTS	12	notes
January 1, 1955	Skyline All-Stars	20	Border All-Stars	13	notes
December 31, 1955	Border All-Stars	13	Skyline All-Stars	10	notes

== See also ==
- List of college bowl games
