= Puny Wilson =

American football player and sports coach (1899–1969)

Biographical details
- Born: October 31, 1899; Fannin County, Texas, U.S.
- Died: May 24, 1969 (aged 69); Tyler, Texas, U.S.

Playing career

Football
- 1921–1923: Texas A&M
- Position: End

Coaching career (HC unless noted)

Football
- 1924: Bryan HS (TX)
- 1925–1934: Allen Academy (TX)
- 1935–1937: Lon Morris
- 1938–1951: Sam Houston State

Basketball
- 1925–1935: Allen Academy (TX)
- 1935–1938: Lon Morris
- 1938–1945: Sam Houston State

Head coaching record
- Overall: 50–49–6 (college football); 66–32 (college basketball)

Thomas Fred "Puny" Wilson (October 31, 1899 – May 24, 1969) was an American college football player and coach. He was an All-American at Texas A&M University in the early 1920s, playing for coach Dana X. Bible. Wilson graduated from Texas A&M in 1924 and was later inducted into school's hall of fame.

Puny and his brother, Mule, are the only two brothers in the Texas A&M football Hall of Fame. Mule was the first Aggie to play in the National Football League (NFL). He won three NFL championships, one on the New York Giants and two with the Green Bay Packers

In 1938, Wilson became head football coach at Sam Houston State University in Huntsville, Texas. He compiled a 50–49–6 overall record in 11 seasons. He also briefly coached Dan Rather.

Wilson died after a cerebral hemorrhage in 1969. He was buried at Tyler Memorial Park in Tyler, Texas. In his later life he worked as a real estate agent.

== Head coaching record ==
=== College football ===
Year	Team	Overall	Conference	Standing	Bowl/playoffs
Sam Houston State Bearkats (Lone Star Conference) (1938–1951)
1938	Sam Houston State	8–2	3–1	2nd	
1939	Sam Houston State	6–2–2	2–1–1	2nd	
1940	Sam Houston State	8–2	3–1	2nd	
1941	Sam Houston State	2–7–1	1–3	4th	
1942	Sam Houston State	5–3	2–1	2nd	
1943	No team—World War II				
1944	No team—World War II				
1945	No team—World War II				
1946	Sam Houston State	6–2–1	3–1–1	T–2nd	
1947	Sam Houston State	3–6	1–5	6th	
1948	Sam Houston State	0–9–1	0–6	7th	
1949	Sam Houston State	3–7	0–3	4th	
1950	Sam Houston State	5–5	1–3	5th	
1951	Sam Houston State	4–4–1	2–2–1	T–2nd	
Sam Houston State:		50–49–6	18–27–3		
Total:		50–49–6			
