= 1938 Sam Houston State Bearkats football team =

American college football season

1938 Sam Houston State Bearkats football
- Conference: Lone Star Conference
- Record: 8–2 (3–1 LSC)
- Head coach: Puny Wilson (1st season)
- Home stadium: Pritchett Field

1938 Lone Star Conference football standings
	Conf.					Overall
Team	W		L		T	W		L		T
East Texas State $	4	–	0	–	0	8	–	1	–	0
Sam Houston State	3	–	1	–	0	8	–	2	–	0
North Texas State	2	–	2	–	0	7	–	4	–	0
Stephen F. Austin	1	–	3	–	0	3	–	5	–	1
Southwest Texas State	0	–	4	–	0	0	–	8	–	0
$ – Conference champion

The 1938 Sam Houston State Bearkats football team represented Sam Houston State Teachers College (now known as Sam Houston State University) as a member of the Lone Star Conference (LSC) during the 1938 college football season. Led by first-year head coach Puny Wilson, the Bearkats compiled an overall record of 8–2 with a mark of 3–1 in conference play, and finished second in the LSC.

== Schedule ==
Date	Opponent	Site	Result	Source
September 23	at Trinity (TX)*	Indian Field; Waxahachie, TX	W 15–14	
September 30	Louisiana Normal*	Pritchett Field; Huntsville, TX	W 14–6	
October 7	at Southwestern Louisiana*	Campus Athletic Field; Lafayette, LA	L 0–14	
October 14	Texas A&I*	Pritchett Field; Huntsville, TX	W 19–6	
October 20	at Lamar*	Greenie Stadium; Beaumont, TX	W 18–0	
October 28	North Texas State	Pritchett Field; Huntsville, TX	W 18–0	
November 4	at East Texas State	Commerce, TX	L 6–14	
November 12	Texas Wesleyan*	Pritchett Field; Huntsville, TX	W 28–7	
November 19	at Southwest Texas State	Evans Field; San Marcos, TX (rivalry)	W 13–7	
November 24	Stephen F. Austin	Pritchett Field; Huntsville, TX (rivalry)	W 13–6	
*Non-conference game
