= 1947 East Texas State Lions football team =

American college football season

1947 East Texas State Lions football
- Conference: Lone Star Conference
- Record: 8–2 (4–2 LSC)
- Head coach: Bob Berry (9th season)
- Home stadium: East Texas Stadium

1947 Lone Star Conference football standings
	Conf.					Overall
Team	W		L		T	W		L		T
North Texas State $	6	–	0	–	0	10	–	2	–	0
East Texas State	4	–	2	–	0	8	–	2	–	0
Southwest Texas State	4	–	2	–	0	5	–	4	–	0
Trinity (TX)	3	–	2	–	1	5	–	3	–	2
Stephen F. Austin	2	–	3	–	1	3	–	6	–	1
Sam Houston State	1	–	5	–	0	3	–	6	–	0
Houston	0	–	6	–	0	3	–	8	–	0
$ – Conference champion

The 1947 East Texas State Lions football team represented the East Texas State Teachers College (later renamed East Texas A&M University) as a member of the Lone Star Conference (LSC) during the 1947 college football season. In its ninth season under head coach Bob Berry, the team compiled an 8–2 record (4–2 against conference opponents) and tied for second place in the Lone Star Conference. The team played its home games at East Texas Stadium in Commerce, Texas.

James "Cargo" Batchelor led the team on offense. He was inducted into the Texas A&M-Commerce/East Texas State University Athletic Hall of Fame in 1979.

East Texas was ranked at No. 108 (out of 500 college football teams) in the final Litkenhous Ratings for 1947.

== Schedule ==
Date	Opponent	Site	Result	Attendance	Source
September 19	Hardin	East Texas Stadium; Commerce, TX	W 20–7		
September 26	at Northwestern State	Demon Stadium; Natchitoches, LA	W 27–0		
October 4	at Howard Payne	Brownwood, TX	W 33–0		
October 11	Stephen F. Austin	East Texas Stadium; Commerce, TX	W 27–0		
October 18	at Houston	Robertson Stadium; Houston, TX	W 33–7		
October 25	Austin	East Texas Stadium; Commerce, TX	W 13–0		
October 31	at Sam Houston State	Pritchett Field; Huntsville, TX	W 28–6		
November 8	at Southwest Texas State	San Marcos, TX	L 7–20	4,000	
November 15	Trinity (TX)*	East Texas Stadium; Commerce, TX	W 28–7		
November 22	at North Texas State	Eagle Stadium; Denton, TX	L 6–12	6,500	
*Non-conference game
