= 1947 North Texas State Teachers Eagles football team =

American college football season

1947 North Texas State Teachers Eagles football

LSC champion

Salad Bowl, L 6–13 vs. Nevada
- Conference: Lone Star Conference
- Record: 10–2 (6–0 LSC)
- Head coach: Odus Mitchell (2nd season)
- Home stadium: Eagle Field

1947 Lone Star Conference football standings
	Conf.					Overall
Team	W		L		T	W		L		T
North Texas State $	6	–	0	–	0	10	–	2	–	0
East Texas State	4	–	2	–	0	8	–	2	–	0
Southwest Texas State	4	–	2	–	0	5	–	4	–	0
Trinity (TX)	3	–	2	–	1	5	–	3	–	2
Stephen F. Austin	2	–	3	–	1	3	–	6	–	1
Sam Houston State	1	–	5	–	0	3	–	6	–	0
Houston	0	–	6	–	0	3	–	8	–	0
$ – Conference champion

The 1947 North Texas State Teachers Eagles football team represented the North Texas State Teachers College (later renamed the University of North Texas) as a member of the Lone Star Conference (LSC) during the 1947 college football season. In its second season under head coach Odus Mitchell, the team compiled a 10–2 record (6–0 against LSC opponents), won the LSC championship, and lost to Nevada in the 1948 Salad Bowl.

North Texas was ranked at No. 78 (out of 500 college football teams) in the final Litkenhous Ratings for 1947.

The team played its home games at Eagle Field in Denton, Texas.

== Schedule ==
Date	Opponent	Site	Result	Attendance	Source
September 14	Hardin	Eagle Field; Denton, TX	W 27–6	12,000	
September 20	Brooke Army	Eagle Field; Denton, TX	W 44–0	4,500	
September 27	at Arkansas*	Quigley Stadium; Little Rock, AR	L 0–12	15,000	
October 4	at Florida*	Florida Field; Gainesville, FL	W 20–12	10,000	
October 18	Stephen F. Austin	Eagle Field; Denton, TX	W 13–7		
October 25	at Sam Houston State	Pritchett Field; Huntsville, TX	W 27–0		
November 1	Southwest Texas State	Eagle Field; Denton, TX	W 27–7	6,000	
November 7	vs. Trinity (TX)*	Temple, TX	W 33–7		
November 15	Houston^{†}	Eagle Field; Denton, TX	W 33–0	10,000	
November 22	East Texas State	Eagle Field; Denton, TX	W 12–6	6,500	
November 27	at Chattanooga	Chamberlain Field; Chattanooga, TN	W 14–7	6,000	
January 1, 1948	vs. Nevada	Montgomery Stadium; Phoenix, AZ (Salad Bowl)	L 6–13	11,000	
*Non-conference game; ^{†}Homecoming
