= Victory Corps =

American WWII student program

- Active: 1942-1944
- Country: United States of America
- Role: Military education and preparation
- Part of: United States Office of Education

The Victory Corps was an American program during the Second World War that provided military training to male and female high school students. On September 25, 1942, Commissioner of Education John W. Studebaker, in conjunction with United States Departments of War, Navy, and Civil Aeronautics, established the Victory Corps. The program was designed to prepare secondary school students for possible military service and participation in the war effort. Although participation in the program was voluntary, many high schools across the country sought to aid the war effort due to rising patriotic fervor following Pearl Harbor. For example, a survey conducted by the American Legion in 1943 found that of 232 high schools in Oregon, 86 schools had established a Victory Corps program and 96 schools planned on implementing the program in the following semester. The United States Office of Education aimed that every high school in the country would implement the Victory Corps program.

At the start of the 1942–43 school year, the United States Office of Education proposed that the Victory Corps purpose was to fulfill two major objectives: 1. The training of youth for the war service that will come after they leave school; 2. Active participation of youth in the community's war effort while they are yet in school. Two categories of membership were offered. A general membership, one for students who were involved in school war effort activities; and a divisional membership open to students in grades eleven and twelve who had completed two years of general membership. The program focused on skills relevant to the war effort, ranging from physical conditioning to more specialized skills depending on the desired branch of the armed forces, such as trigonometry for the U.S. Navy. Broadly, the Corps emphasized "science, mathematics, and physical education". Specifically, the program consisted of eight areas of training to prepare students for war service and war effort participation:

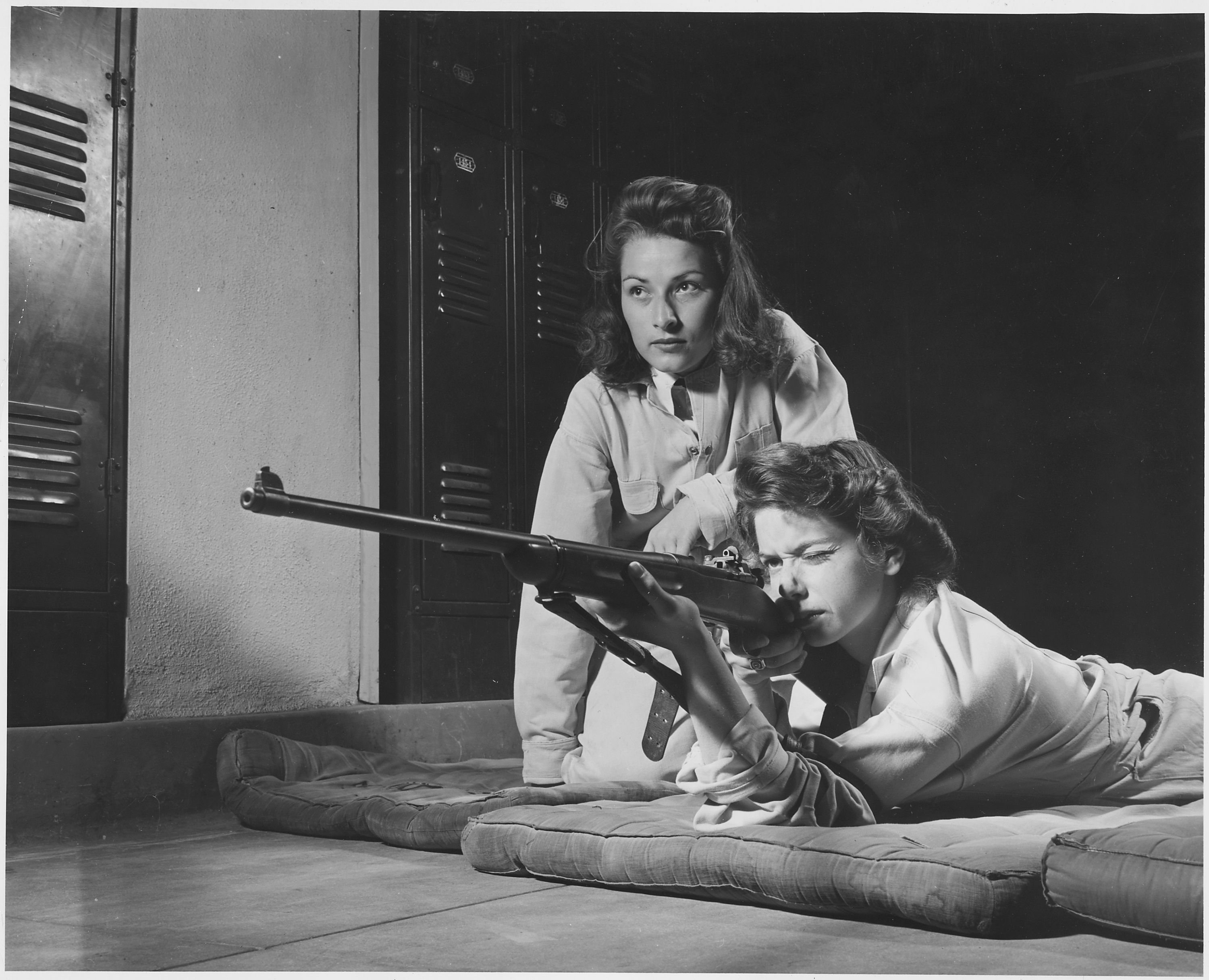
Victory Corps at Roosevelt High School in Los Angeles, Calif.

- Guidance into Critical Services and Occupations
- Wartime Citizenship
- Physical Fitness
- Basic Training in Mathematics and Science
- Pre-flight Aeronautics
- Production Training for Critical Occupations
- Community Service
- Military Drill

From these areas, students would choose an occupational path based on their strengths and interests. These paths, or divisions, included the following: air service (for aviation cadets or aircraft repair), sea service (for the Navy or Merchant Marine), land service (for the Army or Marine Corps), production service (for trades and war industries), and community service (for professional positions such as engineering and nursing). Along with the program's curriculum being taught in the classroom, school clubs were also created and modified for war work. For example, at Whittier High School in Whittier, California, the Home Economics Club made garments for the Red Cross while the World Friend's Club held panels on post-war problems.

Victory Corps Division Badges
| Air Service | Sea Service | Land Service | Community Service | Production Service |

The ambition of the Victory Corps Program was not always matched with application. The program was only implemented into 52% of schools, and these schools complained of being understaffed, and unsure of how to implement the Victory Corps into their existing curriculum. Criticism of the program came from Quakers and Brethren churches as they feared that the introduction of the Victory Corps was a step towards militarism in American schools. Parallels were drawn between the militarization of German and Japanese schooling and youth movements.

As the war drew to a close in Europe and Asia, the Corps was gradually phased out starting in June 1944. However, the Victory Corps Program made a significant impact in the United States war effort during WWII. During its two years of existence, the program distributed a substantial amount of knowledge to schools across the country and raised millions of dollars for the war effort. Along with its practical achievements, the Victory Corps program was also groundbreaking for its time because it allowed participation from both white and African-American students, ten years before public schools were desegregated.
