= Donna Independent School District =

School district in Texas, United States

Address
- 904 Hester Avenue Donna, Texas, USA ESC Region 1
- Coordinates: 26°10′25″N 98°3′19″W

District information
- Type: Independent School District
- Motto: People First! Students Always!
- Grades: PK-12
- Established: March 15, 1919; 107 years ago
- Superintendent: Dr. Angela Dominguez
- Governing agency: Texas Education Agency
- Schools: 18
- NCES District ID: 4817390
- Affiliation: University Interscholastic League

Students and staff
- Students: 12,443

Other information
- Website: www.donnaisd.net

Donna Independent School District (Donna ISD or DISD) is a public school district headquartered in Donna, Texas, United States. Covering approximately 88 square miles in Hidalgo County, the district serves Donna, the communities of Scissors and South Alamo, and portions of Alamo, Midway North, and Midway South.

As of 2026, Donna ISD operates 18 campuses, including 2 high schools, 4 middle schools, 11 primary schools, and an alternative high school, as well as a virtual school program. The district most recently received a "B" rating from the Texas Education Agency (TEA).

== History ==
Donna ISD was established in 1919. As of 1984, the district operated Donna High School (grades 9-12), Donna Junior High School (7-8), J.P. LeNoir Middle School (6), Moye Elementary School (5), Donna Elementary School (3-4), Guzman Elementary School (1-2), Runn Elementary School (K-3), and Stainke Elementary School (K-1).

Stephen F. Austin Elementary School (4) opened in 1986 and the district reconfigured the following elementary campuses into a feeder system: Donna ES (2-3), Guzman (1), and Stainke (PK-K). DJHS was renamed W.A. Todd Junior High School.

In 1987, the district reconfigured again with SFA ES (3-4), Donna ES (1-2), and Stainke (PK-1) as Guzman was temporarily taken out of service. Runn ES added PK in 1988 (now PK-3) as Stainke returned to a PK-K campus. A.P. Solis Middle School (6) opened in 1989, and LeNoir (1) became an elementary campus. Donna ES shifted to only 2nd grade in 1990.

1991 saw the opening of Stephen F. Austin "B" Elementary School (4-5) as another major shift took place. Guzman ES reopened with grades PK-3, while Donna ES and SFA "A" ES became 1-3 campuses. Additionally, the Todd JH became Todd Middle School as it split grades 6-8 with Solis MS.

By 1994, four elementary schools were renamed: Donna ES was renamed to Antonio M. Ochoa Elementary, Runn ES to Truman Price (now PK-5), SFA "A" to Juan W. Cacares Elementary, and SFA "B" to Magin Rivas Elementary. LeNoir ES (1-3) and Moye ES (4-5) also saw their configurations change.

Captain Daniel Salinas II Elementary School (PK-5) opened in 1995 and Guzman ES was reconfigured to match. Price ES was reverted back to Runn ES, now with grades PK-4. A new Price ES (1-5) campus was opened in 1996, along with Donna Alternative High School, as Moye ES was temporarily closed.

Moye ES returned to service in 1997, again with grades 4-5. Ochoa ES moved to a PK-5 setup and Salinas ES moved to PK-4. Price ES added kindergarten in 1998, followed by the reconfiguration of Rivas ES (1-5) in 1999 with the addition of Patricia S. Garza and Maria Alicia P. Munoz elementary schools (both PK-5).

The turn of the millennium saw major changes for the district as total enrollment surpassed 10,000 students. Todd MS became a 9th Grade Center and Veterans Middle School opened to take its place. At long last, all 11 elementary schools moved to a PK-5 grade configuration.

Daniel Singletary Sr. Elementary School opened in 2003, followed by Eloy Garza Salazar Elementary School and Dora M. Sauceda Middle School in 2004.

Julia S. Adame Elementary School joined the fold in 2007, followed by the 3D Academy in 2008 and Excel Academy in 2012. With the opening of Donna North High School in 2013, the 9th Grade Center reverted back to Todd MS. 2013 was also the year DISD surpassed 15,000 total students.

Runn ES became a Virtual Learning Academy in 2021, serving grades K-6, before closing in 2022 alongside the 3D Academy. Also in 2022, Caceres ES became a "Discovery Intermediate Academy" with grades 3-5 and Rivas ES became a "Primary Discovery Academy" serving PK-2.

2025 saw the closure of Guzman ES and Price ES, while Ochoa ES converted to a "Primary Science & Sports Academy" and Stainke became an "Intermediate Science & Sports Academy." Additionally, Salinas ES and Sauceda MS both transitioned into "S.T.E.A.M." academies, keeping their grade configurations, while Adame ES became an "Arts Academy."

Dr. Angela Dominguez has served as superintendent of Donna ISD since October 2021 and is the first woman to hold that role in the district’s history. In 2025, she was named Region One Superintendent of the Year by the Texas Association of School Boards (TASB). Under her leadership, the district has implemented a multi-year strategic plan focused on college, career, and military readiness; literacy; and instructional innovation.

== Academics and performance ==
As of the 2024–25 school year, Donna ISD serves approximately 12,937 students across 21 campuses. According to the Texas Tribune’s *Texas Public Schools* database:

- 79 % of students are considered "at risk" under state criteria.
- 53 % participate in bilingual or English as a Second Language programs.
- The class of 2024 graduation rate was 96.3 %, with a 0.7 % dropout rate for grades 9–12.

According to the Texas Education Agency’s 2024 accountability report, Donna ISD earned:

- Student Achievement: 74/100
- School Progress: 79/100
- Closing the Gaps: 73/100

== Former controversies and legal matters (summary) ==
Over time, Donna ISD has been involved in various legal disputes and administrative investigations. These included allegations of improper fund use in the mid-2000s and legal challenges involving former administrators. The Texas Education Agency reviewed financial practices and found irregularities in federal fund management but no criminal charges against current staff. A former board president was sentenced in 2011 in connection with a bribery scheme. These events are noted here for historical completeness; all cases have since been resolved.

== Schools ==
=== High schools (grades 9-12) ===
| Name | Establshed | Mascot | Colors | Additional information |
|---|---|---|---|---|
| Donna High School | 1919 | Redskins | Maroon & Gold | |
| Donna North High School | 2013 | Chiefs | Maroon & Black | |

=== Middle schools (grades 6–8) ===
| Name | Established | Mascot | Colors | Additional information |
|---|---|---|---|---|
| D.M. Sauceda S.T.E.A.M. Academy | 2004 | Seminoles | Maroon & Black | |
| A.P. Solis Middle School | 1989 | Braves | Maroon & Gold | |
| Veterans Middle School | 2000 | Warriors | Maroon & Gray | |
| W.A. Todd Middle School | 1984 | Cherokees | Maroon & Gold | Former 9th Grade Center |

=== Elementary schools (grades PK–5) ===
| Name | Established | Additional information |
|---|---|---|
| J.S. Adame Arts Academy | 2007 | |
| J.W. Caceres Discovery Intermediate Academy | 1986 | |
| P.S. Garza Elementary School | 1999 | |
| J.P. LeNoir Elementary School | 1926 | |
| M.A.P. Munoz Elementary School | 1999 | |
| A.M. Ochoa Primary Science & Sports Academy | Unknown | Name changed from Donna ES until 1994 |
| M. Rivas Primary Discovery Academy | 1991 | |
| Captain D. Salinas II Elementary School | 1995 | |
| E.G. Salazar Elementary School | 2004 | |
| D. Singleterry Elementary School | 2003 | |
| C. Stainke Intermediate Science & Sports Academy | Unknown | |

=== Alternative programs ===
- Disciplinary Alternative Education Program

=== Former Schools ===
| Name | Opened | Closed | Additional information |
|---|---|---|---|
| 3D Academy | 2008 | 2022 | |
| Excel Academy | 2008 | Unknown | |
| B.G. Guzman Elementary School | Unknown | 2025 | |
| Truman Price Elementary School | 1996 | 2025 | |
| Runn Elementary School | 1904 | 2022 | |
