= Donna, Texas =

- City
- Motto: "The Heart of the Valley"
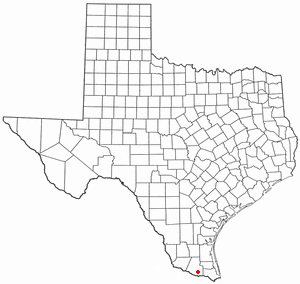
- Location of Donna, Texas

- Coordinates: 26°10′13″N 98°2′57″W
- Country: United States of America
- State: Texas
- County: Hidalgo

Area
  - Total: 8.30 sq mi (21.50 km^{2})
  - Land: 8.29 sq mi (21.48 km^{2})
  - Water: 0.012 sq mi (0.03 km^{2})
- Elevation: 92 ft (28 m)

Population (2020)
  - Total: 16,797
  - Density: 2,025/sq mi (782.0/km^{2})
- Time zone: UTC-6 (Central (CST))
  - Summer (DST): UTC-5 (CDT)
- ZIP code: 78537
- Area code: 956
- FIPS code: 48-20884
- GNIS feature ID: 1334485
- Website: cityofdonna.org

Donna is a city in Hidalgo County, Texas, United States. Donna is part of the McAllen–Edinburg–Mission and Reynosa–McAllen metropolitan areas. The population was 16,797 at the 2020 census.

== History ==
Donna is in southeastern Hidalgo County, 11 miles (18 km) east of McAllen, in territory that was granted to Lino Cabazos as part of the La Blanca land grant on May 19, 1834, by the Mexican state of Tamaulipas. The Cabazos family inhabited the area for at least twenty years after taking possession of the land, and their descendants continued to live in the area into the twentieth century. The first known Anglo-American settler was John F. Webber, who, accompanied by his wife Sylvia (Hector), a former slave, settled in the area in 1839. The Webbers moved to the area in order to escape persecution for their interracial marriage.

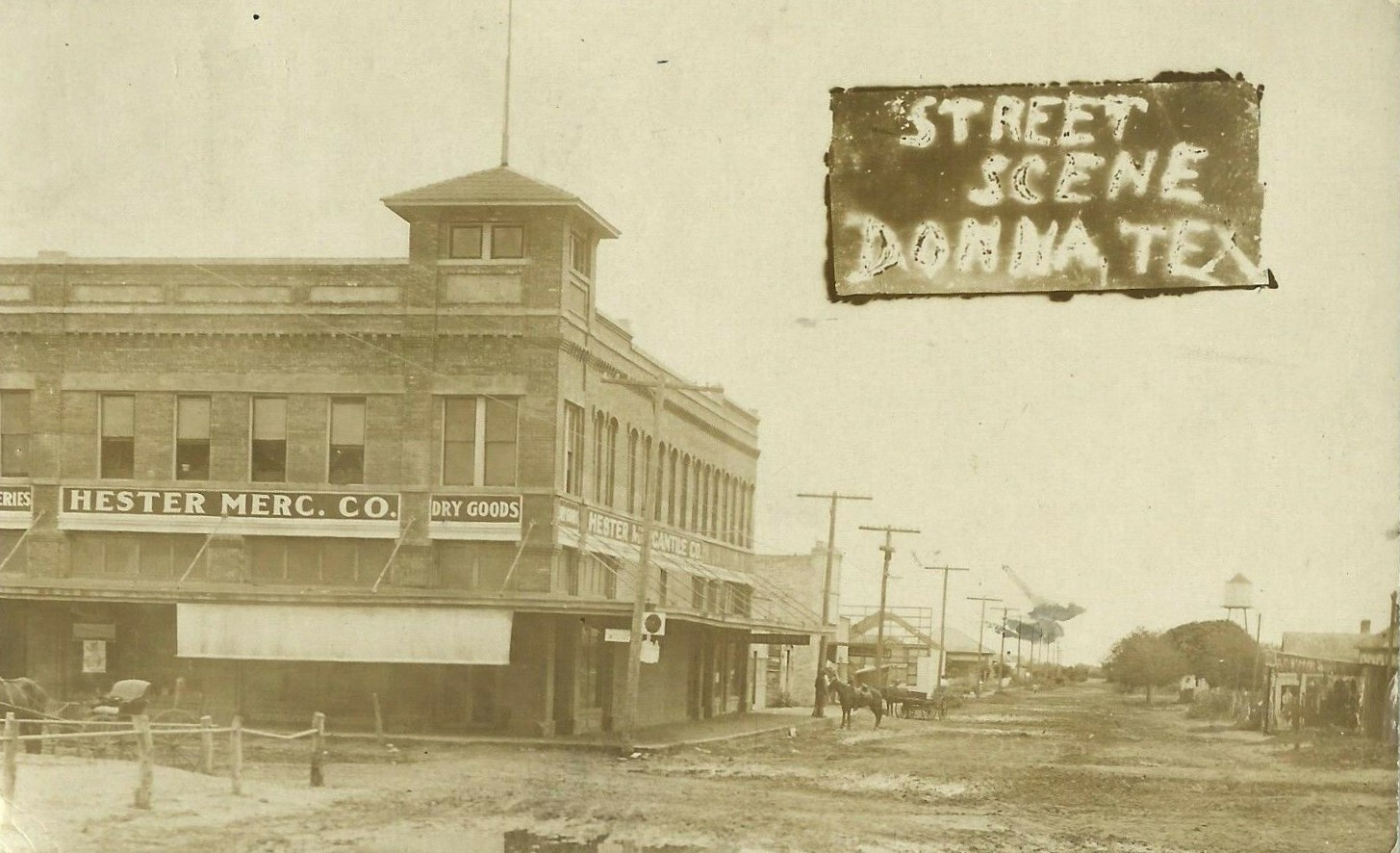
Donna, Texas was shown in a postcard mailed on November 15, 1916.

Several families from northern states, including the Ruthven, Champion, and Hooks families, settled the area. Thomas Jefferson Hooks arrived in the Lower Rio Grande valley in 1900 and the following year moved his family to Run in southeastern Hidalgo County. In May 1902 he helped to form the La Blanca Agricultural Company, which purchased 23,000 acres (93 km^{2}) fronting the river 2 miles (3 km) east and west of the site of present Donna and extending north 18 miles (29 km). He gave part of his purchase to his 21-year-old daughter, Donna Hooks Fletcher, a divorcée.

She settled in the area and established the Alameda (Grove) Ranch. Fletcher stocked the ranch with Jersey cattle purchased from the Lassater Ranch in Falfurrias and ran a successful butter business. The Hidalgo and San Miguel Extension (later called the Sam Fordyce Branch) of the St. Louis, Brownsville and Mexico Railway reached the site in July 1904, when the town was founded. In 1907 the town received a depot and was named "Donna" in honor of Donna Fletcher (1879-1969), who was postmistress when the Donna post office opened in 1908.

That year the first store in west Donna was established by Ed Ruthven, and the community was recognized as the Texas station that shipped the most produce in a year. A 500-ton-capacity sugar mill was built in Donna that year. The Donna Developer was first printed on December 1, 1910, in Chapin. That year the Community Church was constructed and shared by the town's Protestant groups. The First Presbyterian Church was founded on July 10, and the First Baptist Church was organized on July 24, 1910. The telephone exchange was installed in 1911. Donna incorporated on April 13, 1911. By 1912 the town was divided into Donna and East Donna. East Donna, the Mexican side of town, had a post office named "Beatriz", after Beatriz Hooks, from 1912 to 1916. Saint Joseph Catholic Church and a school for Mexican children were located there.

A store was moved from Run to Donna in 1914 by Andrew Champion. In 1915 Donna had a population of 1,500, a bank, a hotel, four churches, two cotton gins, the sugar mill, and a weekly newspaper named the Donna Dispatch, published by B. L. Brooks. In 1916 the Donna Light and Power Company was incorporated by A. F. Hester Sr., T. J. Hooks, Dr. J. B. Roberts, and twenty stockholders. The American Legion Hall, Donna Border Post No. 107, was dedicated in 1920. Donna had an estimated population of 1,579 in 1925. By 1936 it had a population of 4,103, a railroad stop, multiple dwellings, and 110 businesses.

The citizens of Donna first started using the motto "The City with a Heart in the Heart of the Rio Grande Valley" to promote the city in the 1940s. By 1945 the town had a population of 4,712 and 78 businesses, and it continued to be a citrus and vegetable growing center. In 1953 Donna had three gins, three wholesale groceries, hardware and farm implements dealers, a wholesale distributor for feed mills, and the Donna News. The election of 1954 drew attention to Donna when Bob Jefferys, a newspaperman, requested that a special contingent of Texas Rangers be sent to the city by Governor Allan Shivers. He alleged that the election campaign was becoming violent because political bosses were physically threatening voters. The American Legion Hall was designated a historical landmark in 1964. In 1967 Donna reported 110 businesses (including eight manufacturers), ten churches, a bank, a library, and a newspaper.

From 1920 through the mid-1960s Donna had segregated schools. A third school for migrant students was in operation through the 1970s. The justification for its operation was that migrant children needed more attention because of their parents' work. It was opened to children in the third to eighth grade and had a separate campus. Donna had a population of 8,982 and 122 businesses in 1978. After the 1970s the economy in Donna continued to be based on fruits, vegetables, and the tourist trade. In 2000 Donna had a population of 14,768 and 369 businesses.

There are five colonias immediately south of the Donna city limits off Farm-to-Market Road 493. Colonia Nueva is on Farm-to-Market Road 493 2 miles (3 km) south of Donna; Colonia Algeria is on River Road and Eleventh Street next to the city dump; Colonia Tierra Prieta is on the east side of Farm-to-Market Road 493; Colonia Salinas is south of Donna; and South Donna is a subdivision. Water is provided to the colonias by Colonia Nueva Water Distribution System, a privately owned enterprise that purchases water from the city of Donna and resells it to 400 colonia domiciles. Tierra Prieta also receives water from North Alamo Water Supply Corporation; it had an estimated population of 180 in 1986.

In 1998 Pablo Lucio Vasquez murdered David Cardenas.

== Geography ==
Donna is located in southern Texas at 26°10′13″N 98°2′57″W (26.170336, –98.049037). It is bordered on the east by the city of Weslaco and on the west by Alamo. The southern boundary of Donna is a few miles north of the Rio Grande, the international border between the United States and Mexico.

Interstate 2/U.S. Highway 83 pass through the northern side of the city, leading west 11 miles (18 km) to McAllen and east 23 miles (37 km) to Harlingen. Via McAllen it is 244 miles (393 km) south of San Antonio. Hooks Avenue is the main road through the center of Donna.

According to the United States Census Bureau, the city has a total area of 8.3 square miles (21.5 km^{2}), of which 0.01 square miles (0.03 km^{2}), or 0.13%, are water.

=== Climate ===
The city can be classified as a hot semiarid climate (Köppen: BSh) similar to that found in southwest Texas and northwest Mexico. Donna, according to the climate map and the data used can be considered the easternmost city with a semi-arid climate in the eastern United States, not far from a humid subtropical climate due to the greater proximity of the coast, which probably limits the group B of Köppen further east of the state.

=== Neighborhoods ===
•North Donna

•South Donna

•Val Verde

•Lunar Heights Colonia

=== Donna Reservoir and Canal System ===
In 1993, the Environmental Protection Agency detected a presence of polychlorinated biphenyls in the fish at Donna Reservoir and Canal System, also known as Donna Lake, during an investigation of a disproportionate number of neural tube defects in the area, with the most likely cause being stated as being an old siphon constructed around 1928. The Texas Department of State Health Services would place a ban on fishing in the lake in 1994 due to potential public health risk, with the EPA declaring it a Superfund site and placing it on the National Priorities List in 2008. In 2020, the EPA and Texas Commission on Environmental Quality officially began removing contaminated sediments and PCBs after various rounds of fish removals, estimated to cost in total $19,000,000.

== Demographics ==
Historical population
Census	Pop.	Note	%±
1920	1,579		—
1930	4,103		159.8%
1940	4,712		14.8%
1950	7,171		52.2%
1960	7,522		4.9%
1970	7,365		−2.1%
1980	9,952		35.1%
1990	12,652		27.1%
2000	14,768		16.7%
2010	15,798		7.0%
2020	16,797		6.3%
U.S. Decennial Census 2020

Donna is part of the McAllen–Edinburg–Mission and Reynosa–McAllen metropolitan areas.

=== 2020 census ===
As of the 2020 census, Donna had a population of 16,797 residents, 5,210 households, and 3,630 families. The median age was 32.3 years, with 30.6% of residents under the age of 18 and 15.3% of residents aged 65 years or older. For every 100 females there were 88.5 males, and for every 100 females age 18 and over there were 84.2 males age 18 and over.

Racial composition as of the 2020 census
Race	Number	Percent
White	6,458	38.4%
Black or African American	43	0.3%
American Indian and Alaska Native	107	0.6%
Asian	16	0.1%
Native Hawaiian and Other Pacific Islander	6	0.0%
Some other race	3,980	23.7%
Two or more races	6,187	36.8%
Hispanic or Latino (of any race)	15,608	92.9%

99.6% of residents lived in urban areas, while 0.4% lived in rural areas.

There were 5,210 households in Donna, of which 44.8% had children under the age of 18 living in them. Of all households, 42.2% were married-couple households, 16.1% were households with a male householder and no spouse or partner present, and 35.2% were households with a female householder and no spouse or partner present. About 18.9% of all households were made up of individuals and 10.5% had someone living alone who was 65 years of age or older.

There were 6,173 housing units, of which 15.6% were vacant. The homeowner vacancy rate was 1.2% and the rental vacancy rate was 11.9%.

=== 2000 census ===
As of the census of 2000, there were 14,768 people, 4,167 households, and 3,525 families residing in the city. The population density was 2,929.5 inhabitants per square mile (1,131.1/km^{2}). There were 5,734 housing units at an average density of 1,137.5 per square mile (439.2/km^{2}). The racial makeup of the city was 76.06% European American, 0.37% African American, 0.60% Native American, 0.18% Asian, 20.40% from other races, and 2.40% from two or more races. Hispanic or Latino of any race were 87.26% of the population.

There were 4,167 households, out of which 43.1% had children under the age of 18 living with them, 60.0% were married couples living together, 20.0% had a female householder with no husband present, and 15.4% were non-families. 13.6% of all households were made up of individuals, and 8.8% had someone living alone who was 65 years of age or older. The average household size was 3.54 and the average family size was 3.91.

In the city, the population was spread out, with 34.1% under the age of 18, 10.7% from 18 to 24, 23.9% from 25 to 44, 17.1% from 45 to 64, and 14.2% who were 65 years of age or older. The median age was 29 years. For every 100 females, there were 92.0 males. For every 100 females age 18 and over, there were 86.2 males.

The median income for a household in the city was $22,800, and the median income for a family was $23,892. Males had a median income of $19,815 versus $17,009 for females. The per capita income for the city is about $10,000. About 32.6% of families and 37.8% of the population were below the poverty line, including 48.1% of those under age 18 and 25.5% of those age 65 or over.

== Government ==
The United States Postal Service operates the Donna Post Office.

== Education ==
The first teacher in Donna was Paciana Guerra of Mier, Tamaulipas, hired in 1911 by Severiano Avila, Apolonio Ballí, and Bentura Bentiz to instruct their children. In 1913, the first graduating class of four graduated from Donna High School. At that time, the Donna school district encompassed all of Weslaco and reached to the Mercedes corporate boundary.

=== Primary and secondary schools ===
Donna is served by the Donna Independent School District. In 2010–2012, Donna ISD received an $850,000 Connections Grant from the Texas Education Agency to provide technology staff development, as well as introduce a 1:1 laptop initiative to specific campuses.

Donna ISD currently has 13 elementary schools, four middle schools, and two high schools.

In addition, South Texas Independent School District operates magnet schools that serve the community in the area.

In 1998, IDEA Academy & College Preparatory opened their doors in Donna as a public charter school. IDEA Donna is the flagship of the IDEA Public Schools network that continues to grow and operate throughout the RGV and across the state of Texas.

=== Public libraries ===
The Donna Public Library is located in Donna.

== Recreation ==
- The Rio Grande Valley, which encompasses Donna, is recognized as one of the best birding areas in the United States. Some locations near Donna include:
  - Santa Ana National Wildlife Refuge to the south
  - La Sal del Rey tract of the Lower Rio Grande Valley National Wildlife Refuge to the north
- "Winter Texans", or seasonal Texas residents, flock to the area during winter months to enjoy the generally mild weather.
- A bridge across the Rio Grande is being constructed to link Donna to the city of Río Bravo, Tamaulipas, Mexico, a city with a population of approximately 150,000.
- The 12,500-capacity Bennie La Prade Stadium is located in Donna.

== Media and journalism ==
=== Area television stations ===
- XHFOX (Channel 2, Matamoros, Tamaulipas (Mexico), licensee: Televisa, Fox affiliate)
- XHRIO (Channel 2, licensee: Univision, Fox affiliate)
- KGBT (Channel 4, Harlingen, Texas, licensee: Raycom Media, CBS affiliate)
- KRGV (Channel 5, Weslaco, Texas, licensee: Mobile Video Tapes, Inc., ABC affiliate)
- KVEO (Channel 23, Brownsville, Texas, licensee: Comcorp of Texas License Corp., NBC affiliate)
- KTLM (Channel 40, Rio Grande City, Texas, licensee: Sunbelt Media Co., Telemundo affiliate)
- KNVO (Channel 48, McAllen, Texas, licensee: Entravision Holdings, LLC., Univision affiliate)
- KTIZ (Channel 52, Harlingen, Texas, licensee: Orbitz Broadcasting Corp., Ion Television affiliate)
- KMBH (Channel 60, Harlingen, Texas, licensee: RGV Educational Broadcasting, Inc. PBS)

=== Area radio stations ===
- KKPS Local Tejano Music
- KNVO-FM Romantica 101.1
- KVLY Mix 107.9 (Adult Contemporary)
- KFRQ The Q 94.5 (Classic/Modern/Hard Rock)
- KBFM Wild 104.1 (Hip Hop/R&B/Rap)
- KHKZ KISS 106.3
- KJAV 104.9 Jack FM (Adult Hits)
- KURV 710 KURV: The Valley's News, Weather & Talk Station
