= Scissors, Texas =

- Census-designated place
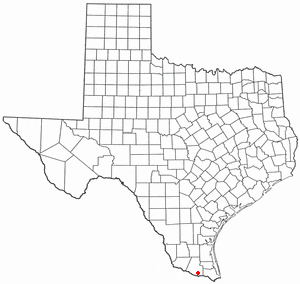
- Location of Scissors, Texas

- Coordinates: 26°8′13″N 98°2′43″W
- Country: United States of America
- State: Texas
- County: Hidalgo

Area
  - Total: 1.7 sq mi (4.4 km^{2})
  - Land: 1.7 sq mi (4.4 km^{2})
  - Water: 0 sq mi (0.0 km^{2})
- Elevation: 79 ft (24 m)

Population (2020)
  - Total: 3,758
  - Density: 2,200/sq mi (850/km^{2})
- Time zone: UTC-6 (Central (CST))
  - Summer (DST): UTC-5 (CDT)
- ZIP code: 78537
- FIPS code: 48-66248
- GNIS feature ID: 1346805

Scissors is a census-designated place (CDP) in Hidalgo County, Texas, United States. The population was 3,758 at the 2020 United States Census. It is part of the McAllen–Edinburg–Mission Metropolitan Statistical Area.

== Geography ==
Scissors is located at 26°8′13″N 98°2′43″W (26.136871, -98.045308).

According to the United States Census Bureau, the CDP has a total area of 1.7 square miles (4.4 km^{2}), all land.

== Demographics ==
Historical population
Census	Pop.	Note	%±
1990	1,513		—
2000	2,805		85.4%
2010	3,186		13.6%
2020	3,758		18.0%
U.S. Decennial Census; 1850–1900 1910; 1920 1930 1940; 1950 1960 1970; 1980 1990 2000; 2010 2020

Scissors first appeared as a census designated place in the 1990 U.S. census.

=== Racial and ethnic composition ===
Scissors CDP, Texas – Racial and ethnic composition Note: the US Census treats Hispanic/Latino as an ethnic category. This table excludes Latinos from the racial categories and assigns them to a separate category. Hispanics/Latinos may be of any race.
Race / Ethnicity (NH = Non-Hispanic)	Pop 2000	Pop 2010	Pop 2020	% 2000	% 2010	% 2020
White alone (NH)	17	78	41	0.61%	2.45%	1.09%
Black or African American alone (NH)	0	1	0	0.00%	0.03%	0.00%
Native American or Alaska Native alone (NH)	5	0	0	0.18%	0.00%	0.00%
Asian alone (NH)	0	0	4	0.00%	0.00%	0.11%
Native Hawaiian or Pacific Islander alone (NH)	0	0	0	0.00%	0.00%	0.00%
Other race alone (NH)	0	0	11	0.00%	0.00%	0.29%
Mixed race or Multiracial (NH)	0	0	1	0.00%	0.00%	0.03%
Hispanic or Latino (any race)	2,783	3,107	3,701	99.22%	97.52%	98.48%
Total	2,805	3,186	3,758	100.00%	100.00%	100.00%

=== 2020 census ===
As of the 2020 census, Scissors had a population of 3,758. The median age was 26.3 years. 36.0% of residents were under the age of 18 and 9.8% of residents were 65 years of age or older. For every 100 females there were 99.4 males, and for every 100 females age 18 and over there were 94.8 males age 18 and over.

97.4% of residents lived in urban areas, while 2.6% lived in rural areas.

There were 925 households in Scissors, of which 54.9% had children under the age of 18 living in them. Of all households, 50.9% were married-couple households, 13.0% were households with a male householder and no spouse or partner present, and 28.9% were households with a female householder and no spouse or partner present. About 10.9% of all households were made up of individuals and 4.7% had someone living alone who was 65 years of age or older.

There were 995 housing units, of which 7.0% were vacant. The homeowner vacancy rate was 0.4% and the rental vacancy rate was 4.8%.

=== 2000 census ===
As of the 2000 census, there were 2,805 people, 604 households, and 561 families residing in the CDP. The population density was 1,642.9 inhabitants per square mile (634.3/km^{2}). There were 673 housing units at an average density of 394.2 per square mile (152.2/km^{2}). The racial makeup of the CDP was 77.68% Caucasian, 0.04% African American, 0.21% Native American, 20.96% from other races, and 1.11% from two or more races. Hispanic or Latino of any race were 99.22% of the population.

There were 604 households, out of which 65.6% had children under the age of 18 living with them, 72.8% were married couples living together, 15.7% had a female householder with no husband present, and 7.1% were non-families. 6.1% of all households were made up of individuals, and 1.8% had someone living alone who was 65 years of age or older. The average household size was 4.64 and the average family size was 4.83.

In the CDP, the population was spread out, with 43.1% under the age of 18, 11.7% from 18 to 24, 27.2% from 25 to 44, 13.1% from 45 to 64, and 5.0% who were 65 years of age or older. The median age was 22 years. For every 100 females, there were 92.9 males. For every 100 females age 18 and over, there were 90.6 males.

The median income for a household in the CDP was $18,963, and the median income for a family was $19,229. Males had a median income of $15,172 versus $14,438 for females. The per capita income for the CDP was $4,914. About 47.0% of families and 51.6% of the population were below the poverty line, including 59.6% of those under age 18 and 52.3% of those age 65 or over.

== Education ==
Scissors is served by the Donna Independent School District. Stainke Elementary School and Runn Elementary School serve sections of Scissors. All portions are zoned by Todd Middle School and Donna High School.

In addition, South Texas Independent School District operates magnet schools that serve the community.
