= Del Norte High School =

Del Norte High School may refer to:

- Del Norte High School (Crescent City, California), Crescent City, California
- Del Norte High School (San Diego), San Diego, California
- Del Norte Junior/Senior High School, Del Norte, Colorado
- Del Norte High School (New Mexico), Albuquerque, New Mexico
