= Corpus Christi Tarpons football =

- First season: 1948; 78 years ago
- Last season: 1965; 61 years ago
- Location: Corpus Christi, Texas

The Corpus Christi Tarpons football program represented the University of Corpus Christi (UCC)—now known as Texas A&M University–Corpus Christi—in college football from 1948 to 1965. Corpus Christi's first season was 1948. Chatter Allen was hired as the program's first head coach and athletic director for the school. The program's last season was in 1965. The university disabanded the football program in January 1966 in order to save money as the school sought accreditation from the Southern Association of Colleges and Schools.
