= List of Texas State Bobcats football seasons =

Annual record of Texas State Bobcats football team.

== Yearly records ==
National champions †	Conference champions *	Postseason appearance ‡	Bowl game berth ^

Season	Head coach	Conference Affiliation	Season results			Playoff or Bowl result	Final ranking
Season	Head coach	Conference Affiliation	Standing	Overall	Conference	Playoff or Bowl result	Final ranking
Southwest Texas State Teachers College Bobcats
1951	Milton Jowers	Lone Star	3rd	6-3-1	2-2-1		
1952	Milton Jowers	Lone Star	2nd	7-2	4-1		
1953	Milton Jowers	Lone Star	3rd	5-4	3-2		
1954	R. W. Parker	Lone Star	T-1st	6-3-1	5-0-1		
1955	R. W. Parker	Lone Star	T-1st	6-1-2	5-1		
1956	R. W. Parker	Lone Star	3rd	6-3	4-2		
1957	R. W. Parker	Lone Star	5th	4-6	3-4		
1958	R. W. Parker	Lone Star	5th	5-5	4-3		
Southwest Texas State College Bobcats
1959	R. W. Parker	Lone Star	7th	4-6	2-5		
1960	Jack Henry	Lone Star	7th	2-8	1-6		
1961	Milton Jowers	Lone Star	6th	4-5-1	2-4-1		
1962	Milton Jowers	Lone Star	2nd	8-2	6-1		
1963	Milton Jowers	Lone Star	1st	10-0	6-0		#9
1964	Milton Jowers	Lone Star	3rd	7-2	4-2		
1965	Bill Miller	Lone Star	2nd	8-2	4-2		
1966	Bill Miller	Lone Star	2nd	7-2-1	4-2-1		
1967	Bill Miller	Lone Star	2nd	9-1	6-1		
1968	Bill Miller	Lone Star	5th	5-5	3-4		
Southwest Texas State University Bobcats
1969	Bill Miller	Lone Star	5th	3-6-1	3-4		
1970	Bill Miller	Lone Star	5th	6-5	4-5		
1971	Bill Miller	Lone Star	2nd	8-1-1	7-1-1		
1972	Bill Miller	Lone Star	3rd	7-3	6-2		
1973	Bill Miller	Lone Star	6th	3-7	3-6		
1974	Bill Miller	Lone Star	4th	6-4	6-3		
1975	Bill Miller	Lone Star	3rd	7-3	7-2		
1976	Bill Miller	Lone Star	4th	5-5	4-3		
1977	Bill Miller	Lone Star	4th	5-4	5-2		
1978	Bill Miller	Lone Star	5th	6-4	3-4		
1979	Jim Wacker	Lone Star	6th	7-4	3-4		
Southwest Texas State moved to NCAA Division II
1980	Jim Wacker	Lone Star	1st	8-3	6-1		#8
1981	Jim Wacker	Lone Star	1st	13-1	6-1	W (38-22) vs Jacksonville State in First Round; W (62-0) vs Northern Michigan in Semifinal; W (42-13) vs North Dakota State in National Championship	#1
1982	Jim Wacker	Lone Star	1st	14-0	7-0	W (27-6) vs Fort Valley State in First Round; W (19-14) vs Jacksonville State in Semifinal; W (34-9) vs UC Davis in National Championship	#1
1983	John O'Hara	Lone Star	1st	9-2	6-1	L (16-24) vs Central State (OH) in First Round	#2
Southwest Texas State moved to NCAA Division I-AA
1984	John O'Hara	Gulf Star	4th	7-4	2-3		
1985	John O'Hara	Gulf Star	5th	3-8	2-3		
1986	John O'Hara	Gulf Star	4th	4-7	2-2		
1987	John O'Hara	Southland	5th	4-7	2-4		
1988	John O'Hara	Southland	6th	4-7	1-5		
1989	John O'Hara	Southland	3rd	5-6	3-3		
1990	Dennis Franchione	Southland	3rd	6-5	3-3		
1991	Dennis Franchione	Southland	4th	7-4	4-3		
1992	Jim Bob Helduser	Southland	6th	5-5-1	2-4-1		
1993	Jim Bob Helduser	Southland	8th	2-9	1-6		
1994	Jim Bob Helduser	Southland	7th	4-7	1-5		
1995	Jim Bob Helduser	Southland	5th	4-7	2-3		
1996	Jim Bob Helduser	Southland	6th	5-6	2-4		
1997	Bob DeBesse	Southland	6th	5-6	2-5		
1998	Bob DeBesse	Southland	6th	4-7	2-5		
1999	Bob DeBesse	Southland	6th	2-9	2-5		
2000	Bob DeBesse	Southland	3rd	7-4	5-2		#25
2001	Bob DeBesse	Southland	7th	4-7	0-6		
2002	Bob DeBesse	Southland	7th	4-7	1-5		
Texas State University-San Marcos Bobcats
2003	Manny Matsakis	Southland	4th	5-7	2-3		
2004	David Bailiff	Southland	3rd	5-6	3-2		
2005	David Bailiff	Southland	1st	11-3	5-1	W (35-21) vs Montana in FCS First Round; W (14-7) vs Cal Poly in FCS Quarterfinal; L (37-40) vs Northern Iowa in FCS Semifinal	#4
2006	David Bailiff	Southland	4th	5-6	3-3		
2007	Brad Wright	Southland	5th	4-7	3-4		
2008	Brad Wright	Southland	2nd	8-5	5-2	L (13-31) at Montana in FCS First Round	#22
2009	Brad Wright	Southland	3rd	7-4	5-2		#25
2010	Brad Wright	Southland	7th	4-7	1-5		
2011	Dennis Franchione	FCS Independent		6-6			
Texas State-San Marcos moved to NCAA Division I FBS
2012	Dennis Franchione	WAC	5th	4-8	2-4		
Texas State University Bobcats
2013	Dennis Franchione	Sun Belt	7th	6-6	2-5		
2014	Dennis Franchione	Sun Belt	4th	7-5	5-3		
2015	Dennis Franchione	Sun Belt	10th	3-9	2-6		
2016	Everett Withers	Sun Belt	11th	2-10	0-8		
2017	Everett Withers	Sun Belt	12th	2-10	1-7		
2018	Everett Withers	Sun Belt	5th (West)	3-9	1-7		
2019	Jake Spavital	Sun Belt	4th (West)	3-9	2-6		
2020	Jake Spavital	Sun Belt	3rd (West)	2-10	2-6		
2021	Jake Spavital	Sun Belt	2nd (West)	4-8	3-5		
2022	Jake Spavital	Sun Belt	6th (West)	4-8	2-6		
2023	G. J. Kinne	Sun Belt	T-2nd (West)	8-5	4-4	W First Responder Bowl	
2024	G. J. Kinne	Sun Belt	2nd (West)	8-5	5-3	W First Responder Bowl	
2025	G. J. Kinne	Sun Belt	5th (West)	7-6	3-5	W 2026 Armed Forces Bowl	
