= 2019 Texas A&M–Commerce Lions football team =

American college football season

2019 Texas A&M–Commerce Lions football

NCAA Division II Quarterfinal, L 21–42 vs. Minnesota State
- Conference: Lone Star Conference

Ranking
- AFCA: No. 11
- Record: 11–3 (7–1 LSC)
- Head coach: David Bailiff (1st season)
- Offensive coordinator: Billy Riebock (1st season)
- Offensive scheme: Spread
- Defensive coordinator: Xavier Adibi (1st season)
- Base defense: 4–2–5/4–3 hybrid
- Home stadium: Ernest Hawkins Field at Memorial Stadium

2019 Lone Star Conference football standings
	Conf.			Overall
Team	W		L	W		L
No. 9 Tarleton State $^	8	–	0	11	–	1
No. 11 Texas A&M–Commerce ^	7	–	1	10	–	3
Angelo State	5	–	3	8	–	3
West Texas A&M	5	–	3	8	–	3
Eastern New Mexico #	4	–	4	8	–	4
Midwestern State	3	–	5	5	–	6
UT Permian Basin	2	–	6	4	–	7
Texas A&M–Kingsville	1	–	7	2	–	9
Western New Mexico	1	–	7	1	–	10
$ – Conference champion; ^ – NCAA Division II playoff participant; # – Heritage Bowl participant; Rankings from AFCA Coaches poll

The 2019 Texas A&M–Commerce Lions football team represented Texas A&M University–Commerce as a member of the Lone Star Conference (LSC) the 2019 NCAA Division II football season. They were first-year head coach David Bailiff. Bailiff replaced Colby Carthel, who left Commerce to become the head football coach at Stephen F. Austin State University. The Lions compiled an overall record an 11–3 with a mark of 7–1 in conference play, placing second in the LSC. Texas A&M–Commerce qualified for the NCAA Division II Football Championship playoffs for the fifth straight season and the eighth time since joining the NCAA in 1982. They finished as national quarterfinalists for the third time in program history.

== Schedule ==
Texas A&M–Commerce announced its 2019 football schedule in January 2019. The Lions played 11 regular season games and finished the regular season 9–2. They were ranked as high as 11th during the season.

Date	Time	Opponent	Rank	Site	TV	Result	Attendance
September 7	6:00 p.m	Selección Nuevo Leon*	No. 13	Memorial Stadium; Commerce, TX		W 83–0	7,319
September 14	3:05 pm	at Western Oregon*	No. 12	McArthur Field; Monmouth, OR		W 34–27	2,890
September 21	6:00 pm	Eastern New Mexico	No. 12	Memorial Stadium; Commerce, TX		W 45–27	7,968
September 28	7:00 pm	at No. 20 CSU Pueblo	No. 11	Neta and Eddie DeRose ThunderBowl; Pueblo, CO		L 17–24	6,921
October 5	7:00 pm	at Texas A&M–Kingsville	No. 21	Javelina Stadium; Kingsville, TX (Chennault Cup)		W 33–6	2,712
October 12	6:00 pm	Midwestern State	No. 20	Memorial Stadium; Commerce, TX	ESPN3	W 54–28	7,446
October 19	6:00 pm	at No. 4 Tarleton State	No. 20	Memorial Stadium; Stephenville, TX (President's Cup)		L 21–35	11,513
October 26	4:00 pm	Western New Mexico	No. 23	Memorial Stadium; Commerce, TX	NEXSTAR	W 62–21	8,154
November 2	4:00 pm	at West Texas A&M	No. 24	Buffalo Stadium; Canyon, TX (East Texas vs. West Texas)	ESPN3	W 34–20	6,734
November 9	4:00 pm	UT Permian Basin	No. 24	Memorial Stadium; Commerce, TX		W 44–13	6,233
November 16	3:00 pm	at Angelo State	No. 23	LeGrand Stadium; San Angelo, TX	NEXSTAR	W 17–3	2,972
November 23	1:00 pm	at No. 3 Tarleton State*	No. 21	Memorial Stadium; Stephenville, TX (NCAA Division II First Round)		W 23–16	8,214
November 30	1:00 pm	at No. 7 Colorado Mines*	No. 21	Marv Kay Stadium; Golden, CO (NCAA Division II Second Round)		W 23–3	1,446
December 7	1:00 pm	at No. 4 Minnesota State*	No. 21	Blakeslee Stadium; Mankato, MN (NCAA Division II Quarterfinal)		L 21–42	1,352
*Non-conference game; Rankings from AFCA Poll released prior to the game; All times are in Central time

== Rankings ==
Ranking movements Legend: ██ Increase in ranking ██ Decrease in ranking
	Week												
Poll	Pre	1	2	3	4	5	6	7	8	9	10	11	Final
AFCA	13	12	12	11	21	20	20	24	24	24	23	21	11
D2Football	13	12	12	11	20	20	19	24	24	23	22	20	7

== Game summaries ==
=== Selección Nuevo Leon ===
	1	2	3	4	Total
SNL Lions	0	0	0	0	0
No. 13 TAMUC Lions	43	6	27	7	83

=== At Western Oregon ===
	1	2	3	4	Total
No. 12 Lions	3	7	10	14	34
Wolves	0	13	0	14	27

=== Eastern New Mexico ===
	1	2	3	4	Total
Greyhounds	3	3	8	13	27
No. 12 Lions	14	10	7	14	45

=== At No. 20 CSU Pueblo ===
	1	2	3	4	Total
No. 11 Lions	3	7	7	0	17
No. 20 ThunderWolves	0	10	7	7	24

=== At Texas A&M–Kingsville ===
	1	2	3	4	Total
No. 21 Lions	7	5	21	0	33
Javelinas	0	6	0	0	6

=== Midwestern State ===
	1	2	3	4	Total
Mustangs	7	7	7	7	28
No. 20 Lions	17	14	14	9	54

=== At No. 4 Tarleton State ===
	1	2	3	4	Total
No. 20 Lions	0	7	7	7	21
No. 4 Texans	14	7	7	7	35

=== Western New Mexico ===
	1	2	3	4	Total
Mustangs	7	0	7	7	21
No. 23 Lions	13	14	14	21	62

=== At West Texas A&M ===
	1	2	3	4	Total
No. 24 Lions	13	7	0	14	34
Buffaloes	7	6	7	0	20

=== At Angelo State ===
	1	2	3	4	Total
No. 23 Lions	7	0	0	10	17
Rams	3	0	0	0	3

=== At No. 3 Tarleton State (Regional Quarterfinal) ===
	1	2	3	4	Total
No. 21 Lions	7	6	10	0	23
No. 3 Texans	10	0	3	3	16

=== At No. 7 Colorado Mines (Regional semifinal) ===
	1	2	3	4	Total
No. 21 Lions	7	0	13	3	23
No. 7 Orediggers	3	0	0	0	3

=== At No. 4 Minnesota State (Regional final) ===
	1	2	3	4	Total
No. 21 Lions	14	0	0	7	21
No. 4 Mavericks	7	14	7	14	42

== Personnel ==
2019 Texas A&M–Commerce Lions football team roster
Players
Coaches
Offense

Pos.	#	Name	Class
QB	2	Miklo Smalls	So
RB	6	J. T. Smith	Jr
TE	11	Tyler Guice	Sr
TE	12	Drake Flores	Jr
QB	16	Mason Ray	So
WR	17	Ryan Stokes	Sr
WR	18	Jeremiah Bridges	So
QB	19	Preston Wheeler	Sr
WR	21	Christion Brewington	So
RB	26	Carandal Hale	Jr
RB	29	Spencer Long	Fr
RB	34	E. J. Thompson	Jr
RB	37	Jemal Williams	So
WR	38	Eric Hebert	Fr
TE	40	Caleb Cilumba	Jr
TE	41	Alex Carswell	Jr
RB	43	JaQuorius Smith	Jr
RB	46	Antonio Leali'ie'e	Jr
RB	47	Chris McPhaul	So
OL	51	Amon Simon	Jr
OL	53	Christian Hernandez	Jr
OL	61	Dawson Holley	Fr
OL	62	Graham Eeds	Fr
OL	63	Solomon Ndukwe	So
OL	64	Travis Dafft	So
OL	67	Jackson Richmond	So
OL	68	Kendall Mathis	Jr
OL	70	Dixon Siuele	Jr
OL	71	Deion Malone	Sr
OL	72	Brian Taylor	Sr
OL	73	Myron Aiava	Jr
OL	74	Richard West	So
OL	75	Coleton Lasseter	Jr
OL	77	Kendrick Murphy	Fr
OL	78	Noah Harris	Fr
OL	79	Matt Mora	Jr
WR	80	Darian Owens	Jr
WR	81	Arnezz Archie	So
WR	83	Kelan Smith	Jr
WR	84	Greg Craddock	So
WR	85	Chance Cooper	Jr
WR	87	Lorenzo Rosario	Sr
WR	88	Matt Childers	So
WR	89	Rayshawn James	Fr
TE		Jackson Allen	Fr
WR		Andrew Armstrong	Fr
OL		James Clark III	Fr
WR		Rashad Dixon	Fr
WR		Austin Dodd	Fr
WR		Max Epps	Fr
QB		Shane Gosson	So
RB		Cameron Grant	Fr
TE		Nathan Jester	Fr
WR		Devin Johnson	Fr
OL		Brandon Laird	Fr
RB		Koby Leavatts	Fr
WR		Daelan Loyden	Fr
OL		Hunter Miller	Fr
WR		De'Rondre Moore	Fr
OL		Stephen Nevarez	Fr
OL		Kelvin Scott	Fr
WR		Aniyah Spencer	Fr
WR		Landry Tyson	Fr
WR		Devlen Woods	Fr

Defense

Pos.	#	Name	Class
DB	1	L.A. Dawson	Sr
DB	3	Sammy Gray	Sr
DB	4	Jalon Edwards-Cooper	Sr
DB	8	Felipe Chambers	Sr
DB	8	Kader Kohou	Jr
DB	10	Alex Shillow	Jr
DB	13	Christian Wise	Fr
LB	15	Terrell Collins	Sr
DB	20	Dominique Ramsey	Jr
DB	22	Darent White	Sr
DL	23	Elijah Earls	Jr
DB	24	Kyevon Rider	Fr
DB	25	Daryion Taylor	Fr
DB	27	Darius Williams	So
LB	28	Mark Westbrook	Sr
LB	31	Jay Bias	Jr
DB	32	Mekhi Roberson	Fr
LB	33	Neema Behbahani	Sr
LB	35	Peter Kazibwe	Jr
LB	39	Joe Butler	Sr
LB	44	Dayne Douglass	Jr
DB	45	Basil Shabazz	Jr
DL	48	Vili Paea	Sr
DL	49	Demondre Lauderdale	Jr
LB	50	Xavier Morris	Jr
DL	52	Peyton Searcy	Sr
DL	54	Devin Beamon	So
DL	55	Pierre Leonard	Sr
DL	58	Ty Reed	So
DL	90	David Brazil	Sr
DL	91	Austin Vaimili	Sr
DL	93	Jaylon Hodge	Jr
DL	94	Brandon Bascue	So
DL	95	Tali Amosa	Jr
DL	96	Dylan Davis	So
DL	97	Chris Williams	Sr
DL	98	Mark Brown	Fr
DL	99	Ronathon Elmore	So
DB		Jordan Austin	Fr
S		Dennis Barnes	Fr
DL		Tank Bell	Fr
DL		Jack Bussey	Fr
S		Larry Cooper	Fr
DL		Isaiah Curry	Jr
LB		Uzo Ebinama	Fr
S		Xzavion Florence	Fr
DB		Gerard Franklin	Fr
DL		Clifford Funderburk	Fr
DB		George Gipson Jr.	Fr
DB		Ibrahim Hassan	Fr
DB		Jack Hurd	Fr
LB		Bryson Jenkins	Fr
LB		Myles Jones	Fr
LB		DeQuavion Ludd	Fr
DB		Champ Mathis	Fr
LB		Ryan Moore	Fr
S		Darius Myers	Fr
DB		Kendall Paul	Fr
DL		Nick Petitti	So
DB		Jordan Polk	Fr
LB		Roman Punch	Fr
DB		Kobe Savage	Fr
DB		Jireh Thompson	Fr
LB		Jordan Wells	Fr

Special teams

Pos.	#	Name	Class
K, P	9	Jake Viquez	Jr
K	36	Andrew Gomez	Jr
LS	47	Chance Work	Fr
K	57	Emmanuel Adagbon	Fr
LS	82	Wyatt Leath	Jr
P		Mitchell McGarry	Fr
K		Jacob Zepeda	Fr

Head coach

- David Bailiff

Coordinators/assistant coaches

- Billy Riebock Offensive coordinator
- Xavier Adibi Defensive coordinator
- Famika Anae Offensive line
- Mitch Ferrick Wide receivers
- Jaylon Finner Safeties
- Casey Walker Defensive line
- Kyle Williams Assistant defensive coordinator/Cornerbacks
- Jack Welch Special teams coordinator/Running backs
- Payton Pardee Outside wide receivers

Legend

- (C) Team captain
- (S) Suspended
- (I) Ineligible
- Injured
- Redshirt

Roster

== Postseason awards ==
=== All-Americans ===
- Dominique Ramsey, First Team All-Purpose
- Amon Simon, Second Team Defensive Line

=== LSC Superlatives ===
- Academic Player of The Year: Alex Shillow
- Offensive Lineman of The Year: Amon Simon

=== LSC First Team ===
- Deion Malone, Offensive Line
- Amon Simon, Offensive Line
- Antonio Leali'ie'i, Running Back
- Dominique Ramsey, Kick Returner & Defensive Back
- Kader Kohou, Defensive Back

=== LSC Second Team ===
- Miklo Smalls, Quarterback
- Ryan Stokes, Receiver
- Jake Viquez, Place Kicker
- Chris Williams, Defensive Line
- Jaylon Hodge, Defensive Line
- Terrell Collins, Linebacker
- Alex Shillow, Safety

=== LSC Honorable Mention ===
- Christian Hernandez, Offensive Line
- Tyler Guice, Tight End
- Chance Cooper, Receiver
- LA Dawson, Cornerback
- Andrew Gomez, Punter
- Wyatt Leath, Deep Snapper
