= 1961 Western Kentucky Hilltoppers football team =

American college football season

1961 Western Kentucky Hilltoppers football
- Conference: Ohio Valley Conference
- Record: 6–3 (4–2 OVC)
- Head coach: Nick Denes (5th season)
- Captain: Winton Boone

1961 Ohio Valley Conference football standings
	Conf.					Overall
Team	W		L		T	W		L		T
Tennessee Tech $	6	–	0	–	0	7	–	3	–	0
Middle Tennessee	5	–	1	–	0	7	–	3	–	0
Western Kentucky	4	–	2	–	0	6	–	3	–	0
Eastern Kentucky	3	–	3	–	0	4	–	5	–	0
Murray State	2	–	4	–	0	4	–	6	–	0
East Tennessee State	1	–	5	–	0	3	–	7	–	0
Morehead State	0	–	6	–	0	1	–	6	–	1
$ – Conference champion

The 1961 Western Kentucky Hilltoppers football team represented Western Kentucky State College (now known as Western Kentucky University) as a member of the Ohio Valley Conference (OVC) during the 1961 college football season. Led by fifth-year head coach Nick Denes, the Hilltoppers compiled an overall record of 6–3 with a mark of 4–2 in conference play, plaching third place in the OVC. The team's captain was Winton Boone.

== Schedule ==
Date	Opponent	Site	Result	Attendance	Source
September 16	at Southeast Missouri State*	Cape Girardeau, MO	W 13–0	4,000	
September 24	East Tennessee State	Bowling Green, KY	W 32–14	4,000	
September 30	at Middle Tennessee	Murfreesboro, TN (rivalry)	L 6–14	6,500–7,000	
October 7	at Austin Peay*	Municipal Stadium; Clarksville, TN	W 26–6	4,500	
October 14	Tennessee Tech	Bowling Green, KY	L 12–13	7,000	
October 21	at Louisville*	Fairgrounds Stadium; Louisville, KY	L 0–20	4,500	
October 28	at Eastern Kentucky	Richmond, KY (rivalry)	W 16–15	7,000	
November 4	Morehead State^{†}	Bowling Green, KY	W 7–0	7,000	
November 11	Murray State	Bowling Green, KY (rivalry)	W 14–6	4,500	
*Non-conference game; ^{†}Homecoming
