= 1961 East Tennessee State Buccaneers football team =

American college football season

1961 East Tennessee State Buccaneers football
- Conference: Ohio Valley Conference
- Record: 3–7 (1–5 OVC)
- Head coach: Star Wood (9th season)
- Home stadium: College Stadium

1961 Ohio Valley Conference football standings
	Conf.					Overall
Team	W		L		T	W		L		T
Tennessee Tech $	6	–	0	–	0	7	–	3	–	0
Middle Tennessee	5	–	1	–	0	7	–	3	–	0
Western Kentucky	4	–	2	–	0	6	–	3	–	0
Eastern Kentucky	3	–	3	–	0	4	–	5	–	0
Murray State	2	–	4	–	0	4	–	6	–	0
East Tennessee State	1	–	5	–	0	3	–	7	–	0
Morehead State	0	–	6	–	0	1	–	6	–	1
$ – Conference champion

The 1961 East Tennessee State Buccaneers football team represented East Tennessee State College (now known as East Tennessee State University) as a member of the Ohio Valley Conference (OVC) during the 1961 college football season. Led by ninth-year head coach Star Wood, the Buccaneers compiled an overall record of 3–7, with a mark of 1–5 in conference play, and finished sixth in the OVC.

== Schedule ==
Date	Opponent	Site	Result	Attendance	Source
September 16	Murray State	College Stadium; Johnson City, TN	L 9–14	4,000	
September 24	at Western Kentucky	Bowling Green, KY	L 14–32	4,000	
September 29	at Chattanooga*	Chamberlain Field; Chattanooga, TN	L 6–27	7,300	
October 7	Tennessee Tech	College Stadium; Johnson City, TN	L 7–12	4,700	
October 14	Eastern Kentucky	College Stadium; Johnson City, TN	L 13–22	5,000	
October 21	at Wofford*	Synder Field; Spartanburg, SC	L 26–33	5,500	
October 28	at Morehead State	Jayne Memorial Stadium; Morehead, KY	W 13–12	5,000	
November 4	Austin Peay*	College Stadium; Johnson City, TN	W 21–14	3,000	
November 11	at Middle Tennessee	Horace Jones Field; Murfreesboro, TN	L 0–27	4,000	
November 18	Newberry*	College Stadium; Johnson City, TN	W 27–21	3,000	
*Non-conference game; Source:
