= 1961 Middle Tennessee Blue Raiders football team =

American college football season

1961 Middle Tennessee Blue Raiders football

Tangerine Bowl, L 14–21 vs. Lamar Tech
- Conference: Ohio Valley Conference
- Record: 7–4 (5–1 OVC)
- Head coach: Charles M. Murphy (15th season)
- Captains: Don Faulk; Jerry Pearson
- Home stadium: Horace Jones Field

1961 Ohio Valley Conference football standings
	Conf.					Overall
Team	W		L		T	W		L		T
Tennessee Tech $	6	–	0	–	0	7	–	3	–	0
Middle Tennessee	5	–	1	–	0	7	–	3	–	0
Western Kentucky	4	–	2	–	0	6	–	3	–	0
Eastern Kentucky	3	–	3	–	0	4	–	5	–	0
Murray State	2	–	4	–	0	4	–	6	–	0
East Tennessee State	1	–	5	–	0	3	–	7	–	0
Morehead State	0	–	6	–	0	1	–	6	–	1
$ – Conference champion

The 1961 Middle Tennessee Blue Raiders football team represented the Middle Tennessee State College—now known as Middle Tennessee State University—as a member of the Ohio Valley Conference (OVC) during the 1961 college football season. Led by 15th-year head coach Charles M. Murphy, the Blue Raiders compiled a record an overall record of 7–4 with a mark of 5–1 in conference play, placing second in the OVC. Middle Tennessee was invited to the Tangerine Bowl, where they lost to Lamar Tech. The team's captains were Don Faulk and Jerry Pearson.

== Schedule ==
Date	Opponent	Site	Result	Attendance	Source
September 17	at Austin Peay*	Clarksville Municipal Stadium; Clarksville, TN	W 40–7	5,000	
September 23	at Morehead State	Morehead, KY	W 19–14	3,000	
September 30	Western Kentucky	Horace Jones Field; Murfreesboro, TN (rivalry)	W 14–6	6,500–7,000	
October 7	at Eastern Kentucky	Richmond, KY	W 22–15	5,000	
October 14	Pensacola Navy*	Horace Jones Field; Murfreesboro, TN	L 7–12	6,500	
October 21	Chattanooga*^{†}	Horace Jones Field; Murfreesboro, TN	L 12–25	7,000	
October 28	at Florence State*	Florence, AL	W 13–3	3,000	
November 4	at Murray State	Cutchin Stadium; Murray, KY	W 27–18	8,000	
November 11	East Tennessee State	Horace Jones Field; Murfreesboro, TN	W 27–0	4,500	
November 23	Tennessee Tech	Horace Jones Field; Murfreesboro, TN	L 6–7	9,000	
December 29	vs. Lamar Tech*	Tangerine Bowl; Orlando, FL (Tangerine Bowl)	L 14–21	6,000	
*Non-conference game; ^{†}Homecoming
