= 1961 Southwest Texas State Bobcats football team =

American college football season

1961 Southwest Texas State Bobcats football
- Conference: Lone Star Conference
- Record: 4–5–1 (2–4–1 LSC)
- Head coach: Milton Jowers (4th season)
- Home stadium: Evans Field

1961 Lone Star Conference football standings
	Conf.					Overall
Team	W		L		T	W		L		T
Sam Houston State $	7	–	0	–	0	8	–	1	–	0
Texas A&I	5	–	2	–	0	7	–	2	–	0
Lamar Tech	4	–	2	–	1	8	–	2	–	1
Howard Payne	4	–	3	–	0	4	–	5	–	0
East Texas State	3	–	4	–	0	4	–	6	–	0
Southwest Texas State	2	–	4	–	1	4	–	5	–	1
Sul Ross	1	–	6	–	0	3	–	7	–	0
Stephen F. Austin	1	–	6	–	0	1	–	9	–	0
$ – Conference champion

The 1961 Southwest Texas State Bobcats football team was an American football team that represented Southwest Texas State College (now known as Texas State University) during the 1961 college football season as a member of the Lone Star Conference (LSC). In their fourth year under head coach Milton Jowers, the team compiled an overall record of 4–5–1 with a mark of 2–4–1 in conference play.

== Schedule ==
Date	Opponent	Site	Result	Attendance	Source
September 16	at Texas Lutheran*	Matador Field; Seguin, TX	L 6–7	5,000–5,200	
September 23	Tarleton State*	Evans Field; San Marcos, TX	W 21–20	5,000–5,200	
September 30	at Sul Ross	Jackson Field; Alpine, TX	L 7–15		
October 7	McMurry*	Evans Field; San Marcos, TX	W 28–13	4,500	
October 14	at Stephen F. Austin	Memorial Stadium; Nacogdoches, TX	W 29–21	3,500–5,000	
October 21	No. 9 Lamar Tech	Evans Field; San Marcos, TX	T 7–7	4,500–5,100	
October 28	Sam Houston State	Evans Field; San Marcos, TX (rivalry)	L 7–9	5,000–6,000	
November 4	at East Texas State	Memorial Stadium; Commerce, TX	L 7–14	8,000	
November 11	Howard Payne	Evans Field; San Marcos, TX	W 23–0	3,700	
November 18	at Texas A&I	Javelina Stadium; Kingsville, TX	L 15–19	7,500–8,000	
*Non-conference game; Rankings from AP Poll released prior to the game
