= James B. Higgins =

American football player, coach, and administrator (1920–1991)

Biographical details
- Born: January 10, 1920; Maypearl, Texas, U.S.
- Died: June 6, 1991 (aged 71); Beaumont, Texas, U.S.

Playing career
- 1938–1940: Trinity (TX)
- 1941: Chicago Cardinals
- Positions: Guard, linebacker

Coaching career (HC unless noted)
- 1949–1952: Lamar / Lamar Tech (assistant)
- 1953–1962: Lamar Tech

Administrative career (AD unless noted)
- 1963–1982: Lamar Tech / Lamar

Head coaching record
- Overall: 59–38–4
- Bowls: 1–0

Accomplishments and honors

Championships
- 1 LSC (1957)

James Benton Higgins Jr. (January 10, 1920 – June 6, 1991) was an American football player and coach and college athletics administrator. He played college football at Trinity University in Waxahachie, Texas and professionally in the National Football League (NFL) for one season, in 1941, with the Chicago Cardinals. Higgins served as the head football coach at Lamar State College of Technology—now known as Lamar University—in Beaumont, Texas from 1953 to 1962, compiling a record of 59–38–4. He was also the athletic director at Lamar from 1963 to 1983.

Higgins was an assistant coach at Lamar Tech for four seasons under Stan Lambert before succeeding him as head coach. After playing with the Cardinals, Higgins entered the United States Marine Corps, reaching the rank of major.

== Head coaching record ==
=== College ===
Year	Team	Overall	Conference	Standing	Bowl/playoffs
Lamar Tech Cardinals (Lone Star Conference) (1953–1962)
1953	Lamar Tech	3–7	2–3	4th	
1954	Lamar Tech	3–7	1–5	T–6th	
1955	Lamar Tech	4–6	2–4	T–4th	
1956	Lamar Tech	4–4–1	2–4	5th	
1957	Lamar Tech	8–0–2	5–0–2	1st	
1958	Lamar Tech	6–2	5–2	T–2nd	
1959	Lamar Tech	8–3	4–3	T–3rd	
1960	Lamar Tech	8–4	5–2	T—2nd	
1961	Lamar Tech	8–2–1	4–2–1	3rd	W Tangerine
1962	Lamar Tech	7–3	4–3	4th	
Lamar Tech:		59–38–4	34–28–3		
Total:		59–38–4			
National championship Conference title Conference division title or championship game berth
