= 2019 West Texas A&M Buffaloes football team =

American college football season

2019 West Texas A&M Buffaloes football
- Conference: Lone Star Conference
- Record: 8–3 (5–3 LSC)
- Head coach: Hunter Hughes (3rd season)
- Offensive coordinator: Jake Brown (1st season)
- Offensive scheme: Pro-style
- Defensive coordinator: Joe Morris (1st season)
- Base defense: 3–4
- Home stadium: Buffalo Stadium

2019 Lone Star Conference football standings
	Conf.			Overall
Team	W		L	W		L
No. 9 Tarleton State $^	8	–	0	11	–	1
No. 11 Texas A&M–Commerce ^	7	–	1	10	–	3
Angelo State	5	–	3	8	–	3
West Texas A&M	5	–	3	8	–	3
Eastern New Mexico #	4	–	4	8	–	4
Midwestern State	3	–	5	5	–	6
UT Permian Basin	2	–	6	4	–	7
Texas A&M–Kingsville	1	–	7	2	–	9
Western New Mexico	1	–	7	1	–	10
$ – Conference champion; ^ – NCAA Division II playoff participant; # – Heritage Bowl participant; Rankings from AFCA Coaches poll

The 2019 West Texas A&M Buffaloes football team represented West Texas A&M University during the 2019 NCAA Division II football season as a member of the Lone Star Conference (LSC). The Buffaloes were led by third-year head coach Hunter Hughes. This was the first season season the Buffs played their home games at the on-campus Buffalo Stadium after the program's previous home stadium, Kimbrough Memorial Stadium, was purchased from the university by the Canyon Independent School District.

The Buffs finished with an overall record of 8–3 with a conference record of 5–3 to finish tied for third in the LSC.

== Preseason ==
=== LSC media poll ===
The LSC media poll was released on July 30, 2019. The Buffaloes were predicted to finish sixth in the conference.

== Schedule ==
Date	Time	Opponent	Site	Result	Attendance
September 7	6:00 p.m.	Azusa Pacific*	Buffalo Stadium; Canyon, TX	W 35–16	10,145
September 14	3:00 p.m.	at William Jewell*	Greene Stadium; Liberty, MO	W 49–21	1,527
September 21	6:00 p.m.	at No. 4 Tarleton State	Memorial Stadium; Stephenville, TX	L 28–58	10,691
September 28	6:00 p.m.	Western New Mexico	Buffalo Stadium; Canyon, TX	W 45–21	7,514
October 5	5:00 p.m.	Central Washington*^{†}	Buffalo Stadium; Canyon, TX	W 48–41	9,124
October 12	6:00 p.m.	at UT Permian Basin	Ratliff Stadium; Odessa, TX	W 14–10	4,610
October 19	6:00 p.m.	No. 25 Angelo State	Buffalo Stadium; Canyon, TX	L 14–17	6,345
October 26	7:00 p.m.	at Eastern New Mexico	Greyhound Stadium; Portales, NM (Wagon Wheel)	W 35–14	2,300
November 2	4:05 p.m.	No. 24 Texas A&M–Commerce	Buffalo Stadium; Canyon, TX (East Texas vs. West Texas)	L 20–34	6,734
November 9	3:00 p.m.	at Texas A&M–Kingsville	Javelina Stadium; Kingsville, TX	W 35–31	3,107
November 16	2:00 p.m.	Midwestern State	Buffalo Stadium; Canyon, TX	W 34–24	6,014
*Non-conference game; ^{†}Homecoming; Rankings from AFCA Poll released prior to the game; All times are in Central time

== Game summaries ==
=== Azusa Pacific ===
	1	2	3	4	Total
Cougars	0	6	10	0	16
Buffaloes	7	0	7	21	35

Statistics	APU	WT
First downs	14	18
Total yards	277	392
Rushing yards	24	200
Passing yards	253	192
Turnovers	2	1
Time of possession	33:21	26:39

Team	Category	Player	Statistics
Azusa Pacific	Passing	Tyrone Williams Jr.	25/38, 253 yards, TD, INT
Azusa Pacific	Rushing	Aaron Baltazar	11 rushes, 17 yards
Azusa Pacific	Receiving	Brandon Jackson	6 receptions, 63 yards, TD
West Texas A&M	Passing	Nick Gerber	18/27, 192 yards, TD
West Texas A&M	Rushing	Prince Ugwu	9 rushes, 70 yards
West Texas A&M	Receiving	Semaj Mitchell	6 receptions, 95 yards

=== At William Jewell ===
	1	2	3	4	Total
Buffaloes	7	7	21	14	49
Cardinals	14	7	0	0	21

Statistics	WT	WJC
First downs	21	27
Total yards	368	444
Rushing yards	184	311
Passing yards	184	311
Turnovers	1	1
Time of possession	19:59	40:01

Team	Category	Player	Statistics
West Texas A&M	Passing	Nick Gerber	14/23, 187 yards, TD, INT
West Texas A&M	Rushing	Duke Carter IV	17 rushes, 103 yards, TD
West Texas A&M	Receiving	Markell Stephens-Peppers	1 reception, 67 yards
William Jewell	Passing	Will Schneider	21/39, 271 yards, TD
William Jewell	Rushing	Brad Dee	16 rushes, 60 yards
William Jewell	Receiving	Ishmial Mitchell	6 receptions, 108 yards, TD

=== At No. 4 Tarleton State ===
	1	2	3	4	Total
Buffaloes	0	0	20	8	28
No. 4 Texans	25	26	0	7	58

Statistics	WT	TSU
First downs	10	24
Total yards	117	420
Rushing yards	30	232
Passing yards	87	188
Turnovers	3	1
Time of possession	23:49	36:11

Team	Category	Player	Statistics
West Texas A&M	Passing	Nick Gerber	10/25, 84 yards, TD, INT
West Texas A&M	Rushing	Jordan Johnson	13 rushes, 31 yards, TD
West Texas A&M	Receiving	Chase Sojka	2 receptions, 32 yards
Tarleton State	Passing	Ben Holmes	15/23, 185 yards, 3 TD
Tarleton State	Rushing	Daniel McCants	14 rushes, 106 yards, TD
Tarleton State	Receiving	Camron Lewis	4 receptions, 61 yards

=== Western New Mexico ===
	1	2	3	4	Total
Mustangs	0	0	7	14	21
Buffaloes	17	7	7	14	45

Statistics	WNMU	WT
First downs	21	28
Total yards	403	496
Rushing yards	59	263
Passing yards	344	233
Turnovers	0	2
Time of possession	35:31	24:29

Team	Category	Player	Statistics
Western New Mexico	Passing	C. J. Fowler	30/49, 344 yards, 3 TD
Western New Mexico	Rushing	Oly Ta'ase	10 rushes, 42 yards
Western New Mexico	Receiving	Reggie Colson III	9 receptions, 98 yards, TD
West Texas A&M	Passing	Nick Gerber	20/34, 233 yards, 2 TD
West Texas A&M	Rushing	Duke Carter IV	17 rushes, 106 yards, 2 TD
West Texas A&M	Receiving	Juwan McCall	4 receptions, 103 yards, TD

=== Central Washington ===
	1	2	3	4	Total
Wildcats	3	7	7	24	41
Buffaloes	20	14	7	7	48

Statistics	CWU	WT
First downs	28	20
Total yards	631	441
Rushing yards	238	217
Passing yards	393	224
Turnovers	3	1
Time of possession	31:49	28:11

Team	Category	Player	Statistics
Central Washington	Passing	Christian Moore	18/31, 339 yards, 4 TD, INT
Central Washington	Rushing	Michael Roots	21 rushes, 207 yards
Central Washington	Receiving	Tyson Rainwater	6 receptions, 116 yards, TD
West Texas A&M	Passing	Nick Gerber	18/31, 224 yards, 2 TD, INT
West Texas A&M	Rushing	Jarrod Compton	15 rushes, 117 yards, 2 TD
West Texas A&M	Receiving	Juwan McCall	7 receptions, 132 yards, TD

=== At UT Permian Basin ===
	1	2	3	4	Total
Buffaloes	0	0	7	7	14
Falcons	0	10	0	0	10

Statistics	WT	UTPB
First downs	15	21
Total yards	296	350
Rushing yards	73	179
Passing yards	223	171
Turnovers	0	4
Time of possession	29:30	30:30

Team	Category	Player	Statistics
West Texas A&M	Passing	Nick Gerber	22/33, 223 yards, TD
West Texas A&M	Rushing	Duke Carter IV	17 rushes, 44 yards
West Texas A&M	Receiving	Chase Sojka	4 receptions, 55 yards
UT Permian Basin	Passing	Caleb Leake	20/36, 171 yards, 4 INT
UT Permian Basin	Rushing	Caleb Leake	16 rushes, 68 yards
UT Permian Basin	Receiving	Kyle McBride	8 receptions, 82 yards

=== No. 25 Angelo State ===
	1	2	3	4	Total
Rams	7	3	7	0	17
Buffaloes	0	0	14	0	14

Statistics	ASU	WT
First downs	15	21
Total yards	291	379
Rushing yards	132	137
Passing yards	159	242
Turnovers	1	0
Time of possession	28:51	31:09

Team	Category	Player	Statistics
Angelo State	Passing	Payne Sullins	17/28, 159 yards, TD
Angelo State	Rushing	Daven Manning	21 rushes, 60 yards
Angelo State	Receiving	Austin Landry	3 receptions, 81 yards, TD
West Texas A&M	Passing	Nick Gerber	16/41, 242 yards, 2 TD
West Texas A&M	Rushing	Duke Carter IV	18 rushes, 61 yards
West Texas A&M	Receiving	Semaj Mitchell	6 receptions, 123 yards, 2 TD

=== At Eastern New Mexico ===
	1	2	3	4	Total
Buffaloes	21	7	0	7	35
Greyhounds	0	7	0	7	14

Statistics	WT	ENMU
First downs	20	21
Total yards	286	373
Rushing yards	153	239
Passing yards	133	134
Turnovers	1	6
Time of possession	28:04	31:56

Team	Category	Player	Statistics
West Texas A&M	Passing	Nick Gerber	14/27, 133 yards, 2 TD, INT
West Texas A&M	Rushing	Duke Carter IV	15 rushes, 91 yards, TD
West Texas A&M	Receiving	Semaj Mitchell	4 receptions, 71 yards, TD
Eastern New Mexico	Passing	Wyatt Strand	11/19, 96 yards, INT
Eastern New Mexico	Rushing	Paul Terry	26 rushes, 123 yards
Eastern New Mexico	Receiving	Johnny Smith	3 receptions, 47 yards

=== No. 24 Texas A&M–Commerce ===
	1	2	3	4	Total
No. 24 Lions	13	7	0	14	34
Buffaloes	7	6	7	0	20

Statistics	TAMUC	WT
First downs	20	23
Total yards	410	334
Rushing yards	196	203
Passing yards	214	131
Turnovers	1	3
Time of possession	31:40	28:20

Team	Category	Player	Statistics
Texas A&M–Commerce	Passing	Miklo Smalls	18/28, 214 yards, TD
Texas A&M–Commerce	Rushing	Jemal Williams	14 rushes, 80 yards
Texas A&M–Commerce	Receiving	Chance Cooper	6 receptions, 63 yards
West Texas A&M	Passing	Nick Gerber	14/30, 131 yards, TD, 3 INT
West Texas A&M	Rushing	Duke Carter IV	20 rushes, 89 yards
West Texas A&M	Receiving	Chase Sojka	5 receptions, 45 yards

=== At Texas A&M–Kingsville ===
	1	2	3	4	Total
Buffaloes	0	14	7	14	35
Javelinas	10	14	7	0	31

Statistics	WT	TAMUK
First downs	24	15
Total yards	462	360
Rushing yards	313	45
Passing yards	149	315
Turnovers	2	2
Time of possession	30:19	29:41

Team	Category	Player	Statistics
West Texas A&M	Passing	Nick Gerber	13/23, 149 yards, INT
West Texas A&M	Rushing	Logan Vallo	15 rushes, 111 yards
West Texas A&M	Receiving	Chase Sojka	3 receptions, 42 yards
Texas A&M–Kingsville	Passing	Koy Detmer	31/44, 315 yards, 4 TD, 2 INT
Texas A&M–Kingsville	Rushing	Luis Lopez	7 rushes, 37 yards
Texas A&M–Kingsville	Receiving	Ryan Martinez	7 receptions, 129 yards, 2 TD

=== Midwestern State ===
	1	2	3	4	Total
Mustangs	3	0	21	0	24
Buffaloes	13	14	7	0	34

Statistics	MSU	WT
First downs	19	21
Total yards	410	424
Rushing yards	91	206
Passing yards	319	218
Turnovers	3	1
Time of possession	29:30	30:30

Team	Category	Player	Statistics
Midwestern State	Passing	Triston Williams	11/22, 214 yards, TD, 2 INT
Midwestern State	Rushing	Lazarus Fisher	15 rushes, 77 yards, TD
Midwestern State	Receiving	Kylan Harrison	3 receptions, 78 yards
West Texas A&M	Passing	Nick Gerber	13/24, 218 yards, 3 TD
West Texas A&M	Rushing	Jordan Johnson	15 rushes, 92 yards
West Texas A&M	Receiving	Semaj Mitchell	5 receptions, 95 yards, TD
