= 2019 Midwestern State Mustangs football team =

American college football season

2019 Midwestern State Mustangs football
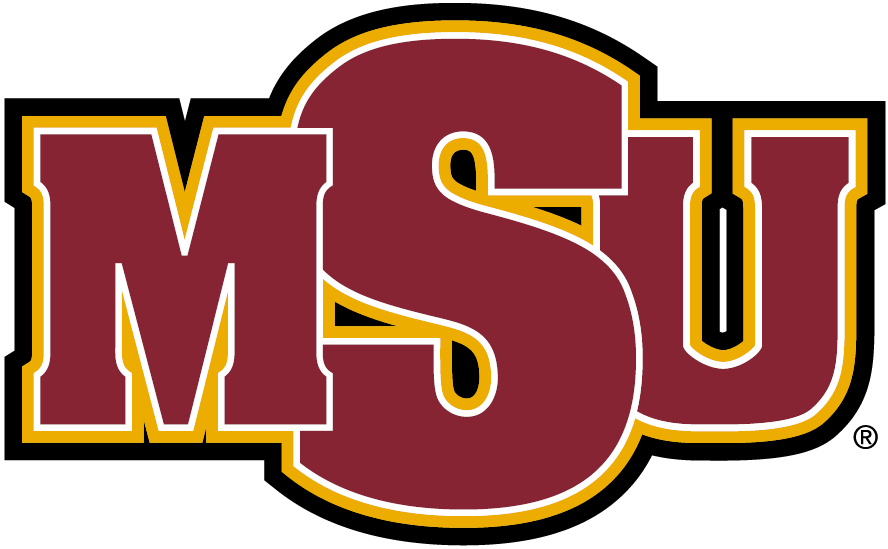
- Conference: Lone Star Conference
- Record: 5–6 (3–5 LSC)
- Head coach: Bill Maskill (18th season)
- Offensive coordinator: Alex Herron (1st season)
- Offensive scheme: Multiple
- Defensive coordinator: Rich Renner (12th season)
- Base defense: 4–3
- Home stadium: Memorial Stadium

2019 Lone Star Conference football standings
| | Conf. | | | Overall |
| Team | W | | L | W | | L |
|---|---|---|---|---|---|---|
| No. 9 Tarleton State $^ | 8 | – | 0 | 11 | – | 1 |
| No. 11 Texas A&M–Commerce ^ | 7 | – | 1 | 10 | – | 3 |
| Angelo State | 5 | – | 3 | 8 | – | 3 |
| West Texas A&M | 5 | – | 3 | 8 | – | 3 |
| Eastern New Mexico # | 4 | – | 4 | 8 | – | 4 |
| Midwestern State | 3 | – | 5 | 5 | – | 6 |
| UT Permian Basin | 2 | – | 6 | 4 | – | 7 |
| Texas A&M–Kingsville | 1 | – | 7 | 2 | – | 9 |
| Western New Mexico | 1 | – | 7 | 1 | – | 10 |
$ – Conference champion; ^ – NCAA Division II playoff participant; # – Heritage Bowl participant; Rankings from AFCA poll

The 2019 Midwestern State Mustangs football team represented Midwestern State University in the 2019 NCAA Division II football season. They were led by head coach Bill Maskill, who is in his 18th season at Midwestern State. The Mustangs played their home games at Memorial Stadium and were members of the Lone Star Conference.

== Schedule ==
Midwestern State announced their 2021 football schedule on March 6, 2019.

| Date | Time | Opponent | Rank | Site | Result | Attendance |
|---|---|---|---|---|---|---|
| September 7 | 6:00 p.m | at Northwestern State* | No. 20 | Harry Turpin Stadium; Natchitoches, LA | W 33–7 | 7,010 |
| September 14 | 6:00 p.m | at Lindenwood* | No. 16 | Harlen C. Hunter Stadium; St. Charles, MO | W 28–27 | 2,500 |
| September 21 | 7:00 p.m | Texas–Permian Basin | No. 16 | Memorial Stadium; Wichita Falls, TX | W 14–8 | 8,432 |
| September 28 | 6:00 p.m | at Angelo State | No. 15 | LeGrand Sports Complex; San Angelo, TX | L 6–28 | 3,053 |
| October 5 | 7:00 p.m | Eastern New Mexico | | Memorial Stadium; Wichita Falls, TX | L 24–27 | 7,111 |
| October 12 | 6:00 p.m | at No. 20 Texas A&M–Commerce | | Memorial Stadium; Commerce, TX | L 28–54 | 7,446 |
| October 19 | 7:00 p.m | Texas A&M–Kingsville^{†} | | Memorial Stadium; Wichita Falls, TX | W 70–35 | 8,878 |
| October 26 | 3:00 p.m | at Western Oregon* | | McArthur Field; Monmouth, OR | L 22–37 | 2,367 |
| November 2 | 2:00 p.m | at No. 4 Tarleton State | | Memorial Stadium; Stephenville, TX | L 7–66 | 7,216 |
| November 9 | 1:00 p.m | Western New Mexico | | Memorial Stadium; Wichita Falls, TX | W 28–13 | 6,389 |
| November 16 | 2:00 p.m | at West Texas A&M | | Buffalo Stadium; Canyon, TX | L 24–34 | 6,014 |
*Non-conference game; ^{†}Homecoming; Rankings from American Football Coaches Association Poll released prior to the game
