= 2019 UT Permian Basin Falcons football team =

American college football season

2019 UT Permian Basin Falcons football
- Conference: Lone Star Conference
- Record: 4–7 (2–6 LSC)
- Head coach: Justin Carrigan (4th season)
- Offensive scheme: Spread
- Co-defensive coordinators: Chris Mineo (4th season); Jacob Martin (4th season)
- Base defense: 3–4
- Home stadium: Ratliff Stadium; Grande Communications Stadium

2019 Lone Star Conference football standings
	Conf.			Overall
Team	W		L	W		L
No. 9 Tarleton State $^	8	–	0	11	–	1
No. 11 Texas A&M–Commerce ^	7	–	1	10	–	3
Angelo State	5	–	3	8	–	3
West Texas A&M	5	–	3	8	–	3
Eastern New Mexico #	4	–	4	8	–	4
Midwestern State	3	–	5	5	–	6
UT Permian Basin	2	–	6	4	–	7
Texas A&M–Kingsville	1	–	7	2	–	9
Western New Mexico	1	–	7	1	–	10
$ – Conference champion; ^ – NCAA Division II playoff participant; # – Heritage Bowl participant; Rankings from AFCA Coaches poll

The 2019 UT Permian Basin Falcons football team represented the University of Texas Permian Basin in the 2019 NCAA Division II football season. They were led by fourth-year head coach Justin Carrigan. The Falcons played their home games at Ratliff Stadium in Odessa, Texas, with one home game played at Grande Communications Stadium in Midland, and were members of the Lone Star Conference (LSC).

The team improved on its 2–9 record from its first three seasons, finishing the 2019 season with an overall record of 4–7. The team went 2–6 in conference play, the program's best up to that point, to finish 7th in the conference.

== Preseason ==
=== LSC media poll ===
In the LSC's preseason poll, the Falcons were predicted to finish second-to-last in the conference, though they also received a first-place vote.

== Schedule ==
Date	Time	Opponent	Site	Result	Attendance	Source
September 7	6:00 p.m.	Wayland Baptist*	Ratliff Stadium; Odessa, TX	W 60–7	3,858	
September 14	6:00 p.m.	Northern Michigan*	Grande Communications Stadium; Midland, TX	W 40–24	4,701	
September 21	7:00 p.m.	at No. 16 Midwestern State	Memorial Stadium; Wichita Falls, TX	L 8–14	8,432	
September 28	7:00 p.m.	No. 4 Tarleton State	Ratliff Stadium; Odessa, TX	L 7–49	4,707	
October 5	6:00 p.m.	at Western New Mexico	Altamirano Stadium; Silver City, NM	L 28–47	1,035	
October 12	6:00 p.m.	West Texas A&M^{†}	Ratliff Stadium; Odessa, TX	L 10–14	4,610	
October 19	12:00 p.m.	at Chadron State*	Elliott Field; Chadron, NE	L 21–43	3,250	
October 26	4:00 p.m.	at No. 22 Angelo State	LeGrand Sports Complex; San Angelo, TX	L 7–65	3,823	
November 2	6:00 p.m.	Eastern New Mexico	Ratliff Stadium; Odessa, TX	W 48–38	3,163	
November 9	4:00 p.m.	at No. 24 Texas A&M–Commerce	Memorial Stadium; Commerce, TX	L 13–44	6,233	
November 16	6:00 p.m.	Texas A&M–Kingsville	Ratliff Stadium; Odessa, TX	W 70–14		
*Non-conference game; ^{†}Homecoming; Rankings from AFCA Poll released prior to the game; All times are in Central time

Schedule source:

== Game summaries ==
=== Wayland Baptist ===
Wayland Baptist Pioneers at UT Permian Basin Falcons – Game summary

Quarter	1	2	3	4	Total
Pioneers	7	0	0	0	7
Falcons	23	16	14	7	60

at Ratliff Stadium, Odessa, Texas

- Date: September 7
- Game time: 6:00 p.m. CDT
- Game attendance: 3,858
- Box score, Recap

Game information
First quarter
- UTPB – Kobe Robinson 35-yard pass from Kameron Mathis (Hayden Decossas kick), 12:47. Falcons 7–0. Drive: 2 plays, 38 yards, 0:32.
- UTPB – Hayden Decossas 29-yard field goal, 8:15. Falcons 10–0. Drive: 10 plays, 45 yards, 3:11.
- WAY – Noah Lujan 22-yard pass from Mitchel Parsley (Kaleb Thornton kick), 5:10. Falcons 10–7. Drive: 7 plays, 74 yards, 2:55.
- UTPB – Kyle McBride 20-yard pass from Taylor Null (Hayden Decossas kick), 3:25. Falcons 17–7. Drive: 7 plays, 55 yards, 1:39.
- UTPB – Kadarryus Hartfield 26-yard interception return (run failed), 3:14. Falcons 23–7.

Second quarter

- UTPB – Marquis Simmons 3-yard run (Hayden Decossas kick), 10:35. Falcons 30–7. Drive: 9 plays, 74 yards, 3:09.
- UTPB – Rocky Barnes 11-yard pass from Kameron Mathis (Hayden Decossas kick), 8:10. Falcons 37–7. Drive: 4 plays, 67 yards, 1:24.
- UTPB – Mitchell Parsley sacked in end zone, 4:26. Falcons 39–7.

Third quarter

- UTPB – Gabe Nelson 7-yard run (Hayden Decossas kick), 2:22. Falcons 46–7. Drive: 8 plays, 33 yards, 2:48.
- UTPB – Gabe Nelson 45-yard run (Hayden Decossas kick), 0:49. Falcons 53–7. Drive: 1 play, 45 yards, 0:09.

Fourth quarter

- UTPB – Clifton Holmes 67-yard interception return (Hayden Decossas kick), 10:09. Falcons 60–7.

Statistics	WAY	UTPB
First downs	12	21
Total yards	231	508
Rushing yards	76	232
Passing yards	155	276
Turnovers	4	1
Time of possession	29:48	30:12

Team	Category	Player	Statistics
Wayland Baptist	Passing	Mitchell Parsley	17/35, 150 yards, TD, INT
Wayland Baptist	Rushing	Jerrell Peterson	21 rushes, 71 yards
Wayland Baptist	Receiving	Braylin Kirby	6 receptions, 81 yards
UT Permian Basin	Passing	Taylor Null	9/14, 164 yards, TD
UT Permian Basin	Rushing	Leroy Giles	6 rushes, 73 yards
UT Permian Basin	Receiving	Kyle McBride	6 receptions, 123 yards, TD

=== Northern Michigan ===
Northern Michigan Wildcats at UT Permian Basin Falcons – Game summary

Quarter	1	2	3	4	Total
Wildcats	7	7	7	3	24
Falcons	7	13	10	10	40

at Grande Communications Stadium, Midland, Texas

- Date: September 14
- Game time: 6:00 p.m. CDT
- Game weather: Sunny, 92 °F (33 °C)
- Game attendance: 4,701
- Referee: Randy Adams
- Box score, Recap

Game information
First quarter
- UTPB – Kameron Mathis 12-yard run (Hayden Decossas kick), 11:49. Falcons 7–0. Drive: 11 plays, 75 yards, 3:11.
- NMU – Tyshon King 5-yard run (Daniel Riser kick), 9:13. Tied 7–7. Drive: 7 plays, 62 yards, 2:36.

Second quarter

- UTPB – Kobe Robinson 80-yard pass from Taylor Null (kick blocked), 14:09. Falcons 13–7. Drive: 1 play, 80 yards, 0:11.
- UTPB – Kyle McBride 19-yard pass from Taylor Null (Hayden Decossas kick), 7:48. Falcons 20–7. Drive: 10 plays, 95 yards, 3:33.
- NMU – Ravon Johnson 1-yard pass from Ryan Johnson (Daniel Riser kick), 0:11. Falcons 20–14. Drive: 8 plays, 82 yards, 2:56.

Third quarter

- NMU – Tyshon King 11-yard run (Daniel Riser kick), 11:09. Wildcats 21–20. Drive: 9 plays, 82 yards, 3:43.
- UTPB – Hayden Decossas 25-yard field goal, 6:45. Falcons 23–21. Drive: 12 plays, 73 yards, 4:16.
- UTPB – Marquis Simmons 7-yard run (Hayden Decossas kick), 0:46. Falcons 30–21. Drive: 9 plays, 77 yards, 2:38.

Fourth quarter

- NMU – Daniel Rise 18-yard field goal, 9:20. Falcons 30–24. Drive: 8 plays, 97 yards, 3:33.
- UTPB – Hayden Decossas 33-yard field goal, 5:46. Falcons 33–24. Drive: 8 plays, 57 yards, 3:34.
- UTPB – Gabe Nelson 11-yard run (Hayden Decossas kick), 2:41. Falcons 40–24. Drive: 5 plays, 39 yards, 2:23.

Statistics	NMU	UTPB
First downs	19	30
Total yards	427	516
Rushing yards	181	158
Passing yards	246	358
Turnovers	3	1
Time of possession	28:43	31:17

Team	Category	Player	Statistics
Northern Michigan	Passing	Ryan Johnson	20/35, 246 yards, TD, 2 INT
Northern Michigan	Rushing	Tyshon King	9 rushes, 99 yards, 2 TD
Northern Michigan	Receiving	Ben Loutsis	6 receptions, 74 yards
UT Permian Basin	Passing	Taylor Null	18/24, 303 yards, 2 TD
UT Permian Basin	Rushing	Gabe Nelson	9 rushes, 44 yards, TD
UT Permian Basin	Receiving	Kobe Robinson	5 receptions, 120 yards, TD

=== At No. 16 Midwestern State ===
UT Permian Basin Falcons at No. 16 Midwestern State Mustangs – Game summary

Quarter	1	2	3	4	Total
Falcons	0	3	5	0	8
No. 16 Mustangs	7	0	7	0	14

at Memorial Stadium, Wichita Falls, Texas

- Date: September 21
- Game time: 7:00 p.m. CDT
- Game weather: Mostly clear, 89 °F (32 °C)
- Game attendance: 8,432
- Referee: Keith Schoby
- Box score, Recap

Game information
First quarter
- MSU – Juwan Johnson 3-yard pass from Zach Purcell (Jaron Imbriani kick), 2:29. Mustangs 7–0. Drive: 10 plays, 72 yards, 4:24.

Second quarter

- UTPB – Hayden Decossas 27-yard field goal, 2:08. Mustangs 7–3. Drive: 11 plays, 31 yards, 3:12.

Third quarter

- MSU – Lazarus Fisher 9-yard run (Jaron Imbriani kick), 8:44. Mustangs 14–3. Drive: 11 plays, 6:10.
- UTPB – Quinton Childs tackled in end zone, 5:03. Mustangs 14–5.
- UTPB – Hayden Decossas 42-yard field goal, 0:53. Mustangs 14–8. Drive: 9 plays, 39 yards, 4:06.

Fourth quarter

- No scoring plays

Statistics	UTPB	MSU
First downs	15	22
Total yards	271	337
Rushing yards	156	181
Passing yards	115	156
Turnovers	2	2
Time of possession	27:35	32:25

Team	Category	Player	Statistics
UT Permian Basin	Passing	Taylor Null	5/14, 60 yards
UT Permian Basin	Rushing	Gabe Nelson	14 rushes, 55 yards
UT Permian Basin	Receiving	Kyle McBride	6 receptions, 73 yards
Midwestern State	Passing	Zach Purcell	16/32, 156 yards, TD
Midwestern State	Rushing	Quinton Childs	28 rushes, 174 yards
Midwestern State	Receiving	Xavier Land	3 receptions, 44 yards

=== No. 4 Tarleton State ===
No. 4 Tarleton State Texans at UT Permian Basin Falcons – Game summary

Quarter	1	2	3	4	Total
No. 4 Texans	21	7	14	7	49
Falcons	0	7	0	0	7

at Ratliff Stadium, Odessa, Texas

- Date: September 28
- Game time: 7:00 p.m. CDT
- Game attendance: 4,707
- Referee: Chad Wakefield
- Box score, Recap

Game information
First quarter
- TSU – Zimari Manning 33-yard pass from Ben Holmes (Christian Hernandez kick), 13:53. Texans 7–0. Drive: 3 plays, 73 yards, 1:07.
- TSU – Zimari Manning 77-yard pass from Ben Holmes (Christian Hernandez kick), 10:23. Texans 14–0. Drive: 3 plays, 80 yards, 1:09.
- TSU – Zimari Manning 74-yard pass from Ben Holmes (Christian Hernandez kick), 3:42. Texans 21–0. Drive: 4 plays, 90 yards, 1:49.

Second quarter

- TSU – Khalil Banks 10-yard run (Christian Hernandez kick), 6:19. Texans 28–0. Drive: 13 plays, 75 yards, 4:18.
- UTPB – Adrian Walker 6-yard run (Hayden Decossas kick), 2:01. Texans 28–7. Drive: 13 plays, 75 yards, 4:18.

Third quarter

- TSU – Khalil Banks 1-yard run (Christian Hernandez kick), 8:58. Texans 35–7. Drive: 2 plays, 5 yards, 0:26.
- TSU – Khalil Banks 8-yard run (Christian Hernandez kick), 2:21. Texans 42–7. Drive: 10 plays, 65 yards, 3:09.

Fourth quarter

- TSU – Prince Robinson 12-yard interception return (Christian Hernandez kick), 12:57. Texans 49–7.

Statistics	TSU	UTPB
First downs	22	15
Total yards	632	318
Rushing yards	288	151
Passing yards	344	167
Turnovers	2	3
Time of possession	32:45	27:15

Team	Category	Player	Statistics
Tarleton State	Passing	Ben Holmes	14/21, 344 yards, 3 TD
Tarleton State	Rushing	Daniel McCants	17 rushes, 135 yards
Tarleton State	Receiving	Zimari Manning	7 receptions, 257 yards, 3 TD
UT Permian Basin	Passing	Clayton Roberts	12/31, 167 yards, 3 INT
UT Permian Basin	Rushing	Marquis Simmons	13 rushes, 44 yards
UT Permian Basin	Receiving	Caleb Forrest	4 receptions, 61 yards

=== At Western New Mexico ===
UT Permian Basin Falcons at Western New Mexico Mustangs – Game summary

Quarter	1	2	3	4	Total
Falcons	7	7	7	7	28
Mustangs	20	3	10	14	47

at Altamirano Stadium, Silver City, New Mexico

- Date: October 5
- Game time: 6:00 p.m. CDT/5:00 p.m. MDT
- Game weather: Sunny and clear, 73 °F (23 °C)
- Game attendance: 1,035
- Referee: John Belcher
- Box score, Recap

Game information
First quarter
- WNMU – CJ Beanes 15-yard blocked punt return (Ignacio Correa kick), 13:24. Mustangs 7–0.
- WNMU – DeAndre Williams 26-yard run (kick failed), 12:36. Mustangs 13–0. Drive: 2 plays, 26 yards, 0:09.
- UTPB – Gabe Nelson 3-yard run (Hayden Decossas kick), 9:23. Mustangs 13–7. Drive: 9 plays, 75 yards, 3:13.
- WNMU – Reggie Colson III 24-yard pass from CJ Fowler (Ignacio Correa kick), 0:19. Mustangs 20–7. Drive: 3 plays, 21 yards, 1:13.

Second quarter

- UTPB – Gabe Nelson 14-yard run (Hayden Decossas kick), 14:34. Mustangs 20–14. Drive: 3 plays, 75 yards, 0:40.
- WNMU – Ignacio Correa 20-yard field goal, 5:59. Mustangs 23–14. Drive: 4 plays, 4 yards, 1:47.

Third quarter

- WNMU – Ignacio Correa 27-yard field goal, 9:46. Mustangs 26–14. Drive: 7 plays, 44 yards, 2:12.
- UTPB – Caleb Leake 88-yard run (Hayden Decossas kick), 9:25. Mustangs 26–21. Drive: 1 play, 88 yards, 0:14.
- WNMU – Elijah Jones 4-yard pass from CJ Fowler (Ignacio Correa kick), 6:21. Mustangs 33–21. Drive: 4 plays, 11 yards, 1:56.

Fourth quarter

- UTPB – Kobe Robinson 9-yard pass from Caleb Leake (Hayden Decossas kick), 14:22. Mustangs 33–28. Drive: 9 plays, 60 yards, 2:26.
- WNMU – Reggie Colson III 21-yard pass from CJ Fowler (Ignacio Correa kick), 10:23. Mustangs 40–28. Drive: 1 play, 21 yards, 0:07.
- WNMU – DeAndre Williams 11-yard run (Ignacio Correa kick), 1:21. Mustangs 47–28. Drive: 6 plays, 62 yards, 2:46.

Statistics	UTPB	WNMU
First downs	21	19
Total yards	423	309
Rushing yards	245	111
Passing yards	178	198
Turnovers	7	2
Time of possession	28:55	31:05

Team	Category	Player	Statistics
UT Permian Basin	Passing	Caleb Leake	6/18, 115 yards, TD, 3 INT
UT Permian Basin	Rushing	Caleb Leake	15 rushes, 136 yards, TD
UT Permian Basin	Receiving	Caleb Forrest	4 receptions, 78 yards
Western New Mexico	Passing	CJ Fowler	16/30, 198 yards, 3 TD, INT
Western New Mexico	Rushing	DeAndre Williams	19 rushes, 71 yards, 2 TD
Western New Mexico	Receiving	Reggie Colson III	7 receptions, 98 yards, 2 TD

=== West Texas A&M ===
West Texas A&M Buffaloes at UT Permian Basin Falcons – Game summary

Quarter	1	2	3	4	Total
Buffaloes	0	0	7	7	14
Falcons	0	10	0	0	10

at Ratliff Stadium, Odessa, Texas

- Date: October 12
- Game time: 6:00 p.m.
- Game attendance: 4,610
- Referee: Jeffrey Bell
- Box score, Recap

Game information
First quarter
- No scoring play

Second quarter

- UTPB – Gabe Nelson 8-yard run (Hayden Decossas kick), 14:36. Falcons 7–0. Drive: 9 plays, 78 yards, 2:55.
- UTPB – Hayden Decossas 22-yard field goal, 0:33. Falcons 10–0. Drive: 9 plays, 33 yards, 3:54.

Third quarter

- WT – Jordan Johnson 12-yard pass from Nick Gerber (Maurico Gonzalez kick), 10:59. Falcons 10–7. Drive: 5 plays, 27 yards, 1:26.

Fourth quarter

- WT – Jordan Johnson 1-yard run (Aaron Coash kick), 14:05. Buffaloes 14–10. Drive: 7 plays, 50 yards, 2:28.

Statistics	WT	UTPB
First downs	15	21
Total yards	296	350
Rushing yards	73	179
Passing yards	223	171
Turnovers	0	4
Time of possession	29:30	30:30

Team	Category	Player	Statistics
West Texas A&M	Passing	Nick Gerber	22/33, 223 yards, TD
West Texas A&M	Rushing	Duke Carter IV	17 rushes, 44 yards
West Texas A&M	Receiving	Chase Sojka	4 receptions, 55 yards
UT Permian Basin	Passing	Caleb Leake	20/36, 171 yards, 4 INT
UT Permian Basin	Rushing	Caleb Leake	16 rushes, 68 yards
UT Permian Basin	Receiving	Kyle McBride	8 receptions, 82 yards

=== At Chadron State ===
UT Permian Basin Falcons at Chadron State Eagles – Game summary

Quarter	1	2	3	4	Total
Falcons	0	7	14	0	21
Eagles	13	14	0	16	43

at Elliott Field, Chadron, Nebraska

- Date: October 19
- Game time: 12:00 p.m. CDT/11:00 a.m. MDT
- Game weather: Clear, 54 °F (12 °C)
- Game attendance: 3,250
- Referee: Don Antill
- Box score, Recap

Game information
First quarter
- CSC – Colton Dolder 34-yard field goal, 11:46. Eagles 3–0. Drive: 8 plays, 65 yards, 3:14.
- CSC – Colton Dolder 32-yard field goal, 8:35. Eagles 6–0. Drive: 6 plays, 46 yards, 2:13.
- CSC – Tevon Wright 18-yard pass from Dalton Holst (Colton Dolder kick), 1:55. Eagles 13–0. Drive: 9 plays, 70 yards, 3:29.

Second quarter

- CSC – Cole Thurness 24-yard pass from Dalton Holst (Colton Dolder kick), 10:16. Eagles 20–0. Drive: 6 plays, 80 yards, 2:12.
- CSC – Chad Mikelson 25-yard pass from Dalton Holst (Colton Dolder kick), 4:42. Eagles 27–0. Drive: 3 plays, 31 yards, 0:41.
- UTPB – Jeremiah Cooley 9-yard pass from Kameron Mathis (Hayden Decossas kick), 1:52. Eagles 27–7. Drive: 8 plays, 77 yards, 2:46.

Third quarter

- UTPB – Kobe Robinson 36-yard pass from Kameron Mathis (Hayden Decossas kick), 8:27. Eagles 27–14. Drive: 7 plays, 82 yards, 3:12.
- UTPB – Kameron Mathis 1-yard run (Hayden Decossas kick), 3:16. Eagles 27–21. Drive: 5 plays, 83 yards, 1:59.

Fourth quarter

- CSC – Cole Thurness 42-yard punt return (pass failed), 11:47. Eagles 33–21.
- CSC – Colton Dolder 26-yard field goal, 8:29. Eagles 36–21. Drive: 6 plays, 9 yards, 2:11.
- CSC – Elijah Myles 42-yard run (Colton Dolder kick), 2:55. Eagles 43–21. Drive: 2 plays, 45 yards, 1:00.

Statistics	UTPB	CSC
First downs	12	22
Total yards	313	484
Rushing yards	48	228
Passing yards	265	256
Turnovers	3	2
Time of possession	26:38	33:22

Team	Category	Player	Statistics
UT Permian Basin	Passing	Kameron Mathis	20/30, 260 yards, 2 TD, INT
UT Permian Basin	Rushing	Davion Sutton	8 rushes, 37 yards
UT Permian Basin	Receiving	Caleb Forrest	1 reception, 66 yards
Chadron State	Passing	Dalton Holst	15/31, 256 yards, 3 TD, INT
Chadron State	Rushing	Elijah Myles	29 rushes, 173 yards, TD
Chadron State	Receiving	Cole Thurness	3 receptions, 81 yards, TD

=== At No. 22 Angelo State ===
UT Permian Basin Falcons at No. 22 Angelo State Rams – Game summary

Quarter	1	2	3	4	Total
Falcons	7	0	0	0	7
No. 22 Rams	10	21	13	21	65

at LeGrand Sports Complex, San Angelo, Texas

- Date: October 26
- Game time: 4:00 p.m. CDT
- Game weather: Sunny and clear, 75 °F (24 °C)
- Game attendance: 3,823
- Referee: Wayne Elliot
- Box score, Recap

Game information
First quarter
- ASU – Connor Flanigan 33-yard field goal, 8:38. Rams 3–0. Drive: 7 plays, 78 yards, 2:18.
- ASU – Lawson Ayo 15-yard pass from Payne Sullins (Connor Flanigan kick), 3:30. Rams 10–0. Drive: 9 plays, 75 yards, 3:39.
- UTPB – Davion Sutton 1-yard run (Hayden Decossas kick), 0:17. Rams 10–7. Drive: 10 plays, 75 yards, 3:13.

Second quarter

- ASU – Keke Chism 39-yard pass from Payne Sullins (Connor Flanigan kick), 8:56. Rams 17–7. Drive: 3 plays, 55 yards, 0:59.
- ASU – Simon Maxey 32-yard interception return (Connor Flanigan kick), 7:59. Rams 24–7.
- ASU – Austin Landry 29-yard pass from Payne Sullins (Connor Flanigan kick), 1:24. Rams 31–7. Drive: 3 plays, 52 yards, 0:49.

Third quarter

- ASU – Kellen Pachot 2-yard run (Connor Flanigan kick), 8:57. Rams 38–7. Drive: 9 plays, 51 yards, 2:55.
- ASU – Daven Manning 1-yard run (kick blocked), 1:21. Rams 44–7. Drive: 8 plays, 40 yards, 3:53.

Fourth quarter

- ASU – Devin Washington 22-yard fumble return (Connor Flanigan kick), 13:55. Rams 51–7.
- ASU – Alize Thomas 4-yard pass from Charlie Rotherh (Connor Flanigan kick), 10:29. Rams 58–7. Drive: 5 plays, 22 yards, 1:52.
- ASU – Alize Thomas 33-yard pass from Charlie Rotherh (Connor Flanigan kick), 5:24. Rams 65–7. Drive: 6 plays, 53 yards, 3:36.

Statistics	UTPB	ASU
First downs	10	25
Total yards	208	510
Rushing yards	115	124
Passing yards	93	386
Turnovers	5	1
Time of possession	27:56	32:04

Team	Category	Player	Statistics
UT Permian Basin	Passing	Kameron Mathis	7/18, 82 yards, 2 INT
UT Permian Basin	Rushing	Davion Sutton	21 rushes, 105 yards, TD
UT Permian Basin	Receiving	Ben Galaviz	3 receptions, 32 yards
Angelo State	Passing	Payne Sullins	23/35, 327 yards, 3 TD, INT
Angelo State	Rushing	Daven Manning	13 rushes, 57 yards, TD
Angelo State	Receiving	Keke Chism	9 receptions, 121 yards, TD

=== Eastern New Mexico ===
Eastern New Mexico Greyhounds at UT Permian Basin Falcons – Game summary

Quarter	1	2	3	4	Total
Greyhounds	7	14	3	14	38
Falcons	7	0	21	20	48

at Ratliff Stadium, Odessa, Texas

- Date: November 2
- Game time: 6:00 p.m. CDT
- Game attendance: 3,163
- Referee: Jarvis Walker
- Box score, Recap

Game information
First quarter
- ENMU – Johnny Smith 35-yard pass from Wyatt Strand (Tyler Vargas kick), 10:57. Greyhounds 7–0. Drive: 8 plays, 75 yards, 4:03.
- UTPB – Clayton Roberts 10-yard run (Hayden Decossas kick), 6:50. Tied 7–7. Drive: 10 plays, 75 yards, 4:07.

Second quarter

- ENMU – Paul Terry 8-yard run (Tyler Vargas kick), 7:29. Greyhounds 14–7. Drive: 11 plays, 63 yards, 5:48.
- ENMU – Johnny Smith 9-yard run (Tyler Vargas kick), 3:05. Greyhounds 21–7. Drive: 6 plays, 40 yards, 2:37.

Third quarter

- UTPB – Kyle McBride 47-yard pass from Clayton Roberts (Hayden Decossas kick), 11:43. Greyhounds 21–14. Drive: 7 plays, 50 yards, 3:10.
- UTPB – Kyle McBride 47-yard pass from Clayton Roberts (Hayden Decossas kick), 11:17. Tied 21–21. Drive: 1 play, 47 yards, 0:15.
- UTPB – Marquis Simmons 31-yard run (Hayden Decossas kick), 4:32. Falcons 28–21. Drive: 7 plays, 76 yards, 2:39.
- ENMU – Tyler Vargas 43-yard field goal, 1:20. Falcons 28–24. Drive: 6 plays, 49 yards, 3:04.

Fourth quarter

- UTPB – Davin Sutton 5-yard run (run failed), 14:11. Falcons 34–24. Drive: 4 plays, 70 yards, 2:09.
- UTPB – Jeremiah Cooley 10-yard pass from Kameron Mathis (Hayden Decossas kick), 7:27. Falcons 41–24. Drive: 8 plays, 65 yards, 4:18.
- ENMU – Justin Manyweather 8-yard pass from Wyatt Strand (Tyler Vargas kick), 5:12. Falcons 41–31. Drive: 6 plays, 75 yards, 2:15.
- UTPB – Donta Stuart 65-yard interception return (Hayden Decossas kick), 3:54. Falcons 48–31.
- ENMU – Justin Manyweather 73-yard pass from Wyatt Strand (Tyler Vargas kick), 3:41. Falcons 48–38. Drive: 1 play, 73 yards, 0:12.

Statistics	ENMU	UTPB
First downs	24	21
Total yards	480	440
Rushing yards	290	231
Passing yards	190	209
Turnovers	5	1
Time of possession	32:00	28:00

Team	Category	Player	Statistics
Eastern New Mexico	Passing	Wyatt Strand	12/18, 190 yards, 3 TD, 2 INT
Eastern New Mexico	Rushing	Paul Terry	24 rushes, 158 yards, TD
Eastern New Mexico	Receiving	Justin Manyweather	2 receptions, 81 yards, 2 TD
UT Permian Basin	Passing	Clayton Roberts	11/20, 182 yards, 2 TD, INT
UT Permian Basin	Rushing	Davion Sutton	17 rushes, 118 yards, TD
UT Permian Basin	Receiving	Jeremiah Cooley	5 receptions, 100 yards, TD

=== At No. 24 Texas A&M–Commerce ===
UT Permian Basin Falcons at No. 24 Texas A&M–Commerce Lions – Game summary

Quarter	1	2	3	4	Total
Falcons	0	0	7	6	13
No. 24 Lions	14	3	20	7	44

at Memorial Stadium, Commerce, Texas

- Date: November 9
- Game time: 4:00 p.m. CST
- Game weather: Sunny, 65 °F (18 °C)
- Game attendance: 6,233
- Referee: Joe Horn
- Box score, Recap

Game information
First quarter
- TAMUC – Kader Kohou 28-yard interception return (Jake Viquez kick), 8:43. Lions 7–0.
- TAMUC – Tyler Guice 3-yard pass from Miklo Smalls (Jake Viquez kick), 3:04. Lions 14–0. Drive: 1 play, 18 yards, 0:09.

Second quarter

- TAMUC – Jake Viquez 38-yard field goal, 5:09. Lions 17–0. Drive: 10 plays, 45 yards, 4:24.

Third quarter

- TAMUC – Jake Viquez 47-yard field goal, 12:04. Lions 20–0. Drive: 6 plays, 27 yards, 2:10.
- TAMUC – Jake Viquez 48-yard field goal, 7:49. Lions 23–0. Drive: 6 plays, 21 yards, 2:56.
- UTPB – Jeremiah Cooley 28-yard pass from Clayton Roberts (Hayden Decossas kick), 5:10. Lions 23–7. Drive: 7 plays, 61 yards, 2:35.
- TAMUC – Matt Childers 78-yard pass from Miklo Smalls (Jake Viquez kick), 4:47. Lions 30–7. Drive: 1 play, 78 yards, 0:14.
- TAMUC – Jemal Williams 19-yard run (Jake Viquez kick), 1:04. Lions 37–7. Drive: 4 plays, 70 yards, 1:42.

Fourth quarter

- UTPB – Davion Sutton 5-yard run (pass failed), 12:01. Lions 37–13. Drive: 8 plays, 54 yards, 3:52.
- TAMUC – Jemal Williams 13-yard run (Jake Viquez kick), 4:28. Lions 44–13. Drive: 9 plays, 80 yards, 5:16.

Statistics	UTPB	TAMUC
First downs	15	22
Total yards	228	461
Rushing yards	86	179
Passing yards	142	282
Turnovers	4	1
Time of possession	26:44	33:16

Team	Category	Player	Statistics
UT Permian Basin	Passing	Clayton Roberts	12/31, 142 yards, TD, 4 INT
UT Permian Basin	Rushing	Davion Sutton	20 rushes, 44 yards, TD
UT Permian Basin	Receiving	Jeremiah Cooley	3 receptions, 54 yards, TD
Texas A&M–Commerce	Passing	Miklo Smalls	21/33, 282 yards, 2 TD
Texas A&M–Commerce	Rushing	Jemal Williams	18 rushes, 103 yards, 2 TD
Texas A&M–Commerce	Receiving	Matt Childers	3 receptions, 136 yards, TD

=== Texas A&M–Kingsville ===
Texas A&M–Kingsville Javelinas at UT Permian Basin Falcons – Game summary

Quarter	1	2	3	4	Total
Javelinas	0	7	0	7	14
Falcons	14	28	7	21	70

at Ratliff Stadium, Odessa, Texas

- Date: November 16
- Game time: 6:00 p.m. CST
- Referee: John Belcher
- Box score, Recap

Game information
First quarter
- UTPB – Ben Galaviz 34-yard pass from Kameron Mathis (Hayden Decossas kick), 11:08. Falcons 7–0. Drive: 4 plays, 52 yards, 1:21.
- UTPB – Kameron Mathis 39-yard run (Hayden Decossas kick), 5:10. Falcons 14–0. Drive: 8 plays, 99 yards, 3:00.

Second quarter

- TAMUK – Kris Barnes 19-yard pass from Koy Detmer Jr. (Romario Perez kick), 14:45. Falcons 14–7. Drive: 11 plays, 73 yards, 5:25.
- UTPB – Kyle McBride 50-yard pass from Kameron Mathis (Hayden Decossas kick), 9:35. Falcons 21–7. Drive: 5 plays, 65 yards, 2:04.
- UTPB – Matt Zubiate 52-yard pass from Kameron Mathis (Hayden Decossas kick), 6:38. Falcons 28–7. Drive: 3 plays, 64 yards, 0:57.
- UTPB – Caleb Forrest 13-yard run (Hayden Decossas kick), 0:32. Falcons 35–7. Drive: 7 plays, 80 yards, 1:50.
- UTPB – Chris Hoad 21-yard interception return (Hayden Decossas kick), 0:00. Falcons 42–7.

Third quarter

- UTPB – Davion Sutton 35-yard run (Hayden Decossas kick), 13:51. Falcons 49–7. Drive: 3 plays, 75 yards, 1:09.

Fourth quarter

- UTPB – Jacob Granado 1-yard run (Spencer Cofer kick), 14:54. Falcons 56–7. Drive: 7 plays, 44 yards, 3:22.
- UTPB – Rocky Barnes 16-yard pass from Dylan Krans (Spencer Cofer kick), 10:02. Falcons 63–7. Drive: 6 plays, 79 yards, 3:00.
- UTPB – Davion Sutton 5-yard run (Spencer Cofer kick), 6:33. Falcons 70–7. Drive: 3 plays, 58 yards, 1:42.
- TAMUK – Alan Smith 7-yard pass from Cade Dyal (Romario Perez kick), 3:43. Falcons 70–14. Drive: 5 plays, 69 yards, 2:39.

Statistics	TAMUK	UTPB
First downs	21	27
Total yards	352	617
Rushing yards	128	418
Passing yards	224	199
Turnovers	2	0
Time of possession	32:58	27:02

Team	Category	Player	Statistics
Texas A&M–Kingsville	Passing	Koy Detmer Jr.	18/33, 165 yards, TD, INT
Texas A&M–Kingsville	Rushing	Kris Barnes	15 rushes, 83 yards
Texas A&M–Kingsville	Receiving	Devin Wilburn	6 receptions, 65 yards
UT Permian Basin	Passing	Kameron Mathis	10/13, 183 yards, 3 TD
UT Permian Basin	Rushing	Davion Sutton	15 rushes, 148 yards, 2 TD
UT Permian Basin	Receiving	Kyle McBride	4 receptions, 73 yards, TD

== Statistics ==
=== Scoring ===
Scores against non-conference opponents

	1	2	3	4	Total
Opponents	27	21	7	19	74
UT Permian Basin	30	36	38	17	121

Scores against the Lone Star Conference

	1	2	3	4	Total
Opponents	79	55	74	77	285
UT Permian Basin	35	55	47	54	191

Scores against all opponents

	1	2	3	4	Total
Opponents	106	76	81	96	359
UT Permian Basin	65	91	85	71	312
