= 1956 Sam Houston State Bearkats football team =

American college football season

1956 Sam Houston State Bearkats football

LSC champion Refrigerator Bowl champion

Refrigerator Bowl, W 27–13 vs. Middle Tennessee
- Conference: Lone Star Conference
- Record: 10–0 (6–0 LSC)
- Head coach: Paul Pierce (5th season)
- Home stadium: Pritchett Field

1956 Lone Star Conference football standings
	Conf.					Overall
Team	W		L		T	W		L		T
Sam Houston State $	6	–	0	–	0	10	–	0	–	0
Texas A&I	5	–	1	–	0	7	–	3	–	0
Southwest Texas State	4	–	2	–	0	6	–	3	–	0
Stephen F. Austin	3	–	3	–	0	4	–	6	–	0
Lamar Tech	2	–	4	–	0	4	–	4	–	1
East Texas State	1	–	5	–	0	2	–	8	–	0
Sul Ross	0	–	6	–	0	1	–	9	–	0
$ – Conference champion

The 1956 Sam Houston State Bearkats football team represented Sam Houston State Teachers College (now known as Sam Houston State University) as a member of the Lone Star Conference (LSC) during the 1956 college football season. Led by fifth-year head coach Paul Pierce, the Bearkats compiled an overall record of 10–0 with a mark of 6–0 in conference play, and finished as LSC champion.

== Schedule ==
Date	Opponent	Site	Result	Attendance	Source
September 15	East Central*	Pritchett Field; Huntsville, TX	W 39–0		
September 22	at Howard Payne*	Lion Field; Brownwood, TX	W 13–7	3,500	
October 6	at Sul Ross	Jackson Field; Alpine, TX	W 33–0		
October 13	Texas A&I	Pritchett Field; Huntsville, TX	W 28–14		
October 20	at Lamar Tech	Greenie Stadium; Beaumont, TX	W 20–6		
October 27	at East Texas State	Memorial Stadium; Commerce, TX	W 9–7	9,000	
November 3	McNeese State*	Pritchett Field; Huntsville, TX	W 14–6		
November 10	Southwest Texas State	Pritchett Field; Huntsville, TX	W 28–0		
November 17	Stephen F. Austin	Pritchett Field; Huntsville, TX (rivalry)	W 31–0	3,500	
December 1	vs. Middle Tennessee*	Reitz Bowl; Evansville, IN (Refrigerator Bowl)	W 27–13	3,000	
*Non-conference game
