= 1953 Sam Houston State Bearkats football team =

American college football season

1953 Sam Houston State Bearkats football

Refrigerator Bowl champion

Refrigerator Bowl, W 14–12 vs. College of Idaho
- Conference: Lone Star Conference
- Record: 9–1 (4–1 LSC)
- Head coach: Paul Pierce (2nd season)
- Home stadium: Pritchett Field

1953 Lone Star Conference football standings
	Conf.					Overall
Team	W		L		T	W		L		T
East Texas State $	5	–	0	–	0	10	–	0	–	1
Sam Houston State	4	–	1	–	0	9	–	1	–	0
Southwest Texas State	3	–	2	–	0	5	–	4	–	0
Lamar Tech	2	–	3	–	0	3	–	7	–	0
Sul Ross	1	–	4	–	0	4	–	7	–	0
Stephen F. Austin	0	–	5	–	0	1	–	8	–	0
$ – Conference champion

The 1953 Sam Houston State Bearkats football team represented Sam Houston State Teachers College (now known as Sam Houston State University) as a member of the Lone Star Conference (LSC) during the 1953 college football season. Led by second-year head coach Paul Pierce, the Bearkats compiled an overall record of 9–1 with a mark of 4–1 in conference play, and finished second in the LSC.

== Schedule ==
Date	Opponent	Site	Result	Attendance	Source
September 26	Howard Payne*	Pritchett Field; Huntsville, TX	W 19–13		
October 3	Sul Ross	Pritchett Field; Huntsville, TX	W 12–0		
October 10	at Texas A&I*	Javelina Stadium; Kingsville, TX	W 49–25		
October 17	Lamar Tech	Pritchett Field; Huntsville, TX	W 43–0		
October 24	East Texas State	Pritchett Field; Huntsville, TX	L 6–32	4,000	
October 30	at Tampa*	Phillips Field; Tampa, FL	W 26–6	4,500	
November 7	at Southwest Texas State	Evans Field; San Marcos, TX	W 21–13		
November 14	at Stephen F. Austin	Memorial Stadium; Nacogdoches, TX (rivalry)	W 25–14	6,000	
November 21	Northeastern State (OK)*	Pritchett Field; Huntsville, TX	W 19–0		
December 6	vs. College of Idaho*	Reitz Bowl; Evansville, IN (Refrigerator Bowl)	W 14–12	7,000	
*Non-conference game
