= 1956 Lamar Tech Cardinals football team =

American college football season

1956 Lamar Tech Cardinals football
- Conference: Lone Star Conference
- Record: 4–4–1 (2–4 LSC)
- Head coach: James B. Higgins (4th season)
- Home stadium: Greenie Stadium

1956 Lone Star Conference football standings
	Conf.					Overall
Team	W		L		T	W		L		T
Sam Houston State $	6	–	0	–	0	10	–	0	–	0
Texas A&I	5	–	1	–	0	7	–	3	–	0
Southwest Texas State	4	–	2	–	0	6	–	3	–	0
Stephen F. Austin	3	–	3	–	0	4	–	6	–	0
Lamar Tech	2	–	4	–	0	4	–	4	–	1
East Texas State	1	–	5	–	0	2	–	8	–	0
Sul Ross	0	–	6	–	0	1	–	9	–	0
$ – Conference champion

The 1956 Lamar Tech Cardinals football team was an American football team that represented Lamar State College of Technology (now known as Lamar University) during the 1956 college football season as a member of the Lone Star Conference. In their fourth year under head coach James B. Higgins, the team compiled a 4–4–1 record.

== Schedule ==
Date	Opponent	Site	Result	Attendance	Source
September 15	at Southwestern Louisiana*	McNaspy Stadium; Lafayette, LA (rivalry)	W 21–14		
September 22	Northwestern State*	Greenie Stadium; Beaumont, TX	T 6–6	5,000	
October 6	at Stephen F. Austin	Memorial Stadium; Nacogdoches, TX	L 18–26		
October 13	East Texas State	Greenie Stadium; Beaumont, TX	W 20–7		
October 20	Sam Houston State	Greenie Stadium; Beaumont, TX	L 6–20		
October 27	McNeese State*	Greenie Stadium; Beaumont, TX (rivalry)	W 18–14		
November 3	at Southwest Texas State	Evans Field; San Marcos, TX	L 6–13		
November 10	Texas A&I*	Greenie Stadium; Beaumont, TX	L 12–28		
November 17	at Sul Ross	Jackson Field; Alpine, TX	W 34–7		
*Non-conference game
