= 1953 Lamar Tech Cardinals football team =

American college football season

1953 Lamar Tech Cardinals football
- Conference: Lone Star Conference
- Record: 3–7 (2–3 LSC)
- Head coach: James B. Higgins (1st season)
- Home stadium: Greenie Stadium

1953 Lone Star Conference football standings
	Conf.					Overall
Team	W		L		T	W		L		T
East Texas State $	5	–	0	–	0	10	–	0	–	1
Sam Houston State	4	–	1	–	0	9	–	1	–	0
Southwest Texas State	3	–	2	–	0	5	–	4	–	0
Lamar Tech	2	–	3	–	0	3	–	7	–	0
Sul Ross	1	–	4	–	0	4	–	7	–	0
Stephen F. Austin	0	–	5	–	0	1	–	8	–	0
$ – Conference champion

The 1953 Lamar Tech Cardinals football team was an American football team that represented Lamar State College of Technology (now known as Lamar University) during the 1953 college football season as a member of the Lone Star Conference. In their first year under head coach James B. Higgins, the team compiled a 3–7 record.

== Schedule ==
Date	Opponent	Site	Result	Source
September 19	Southwestern Louisiana*	Greenie Stadium; Beaumont, TX (rivalry)	L 13–22	
September 26	at Northwestern State*	Demon Field; Natchitoches, LA	L 6–12	
October 3	Stephen F. Austin	Greenie Stadium; Beaumont, TX	W 19–13	
October 10	at East Texas State	Memorial Stadium; Commerce, TX	L 13–32	
October 17	at Sam Houston State	Pritchett Field; Huntsville, TX	L 0–43	
October 24	Abilene Christian*	Greenie Stadium; Beaumont, TX	L 21–26	
October 31	Southwest Texas State	Greenie Stadium; Beaumont, TX	L 6–14	
November 7	vs. McMurry*	Ballinger, TX	L 27–32	
November 14	Sul Ross	Greenie Stadium; Beaumont, TX	W 21–0	
November 28	at Instituto Politécnico Nacional*	Mexico City, MX	W 60–12	
*Non-conference game
