= 1961 Sam Houston State Bearkats football team =

American college football season

1961 Sam Houston State Bearkats football

LSC champion
- Conference: Lone Star Conference
- Record: 8–1 (7–0 LSC)
- Head coach: Paul Pierce (10th season)
- Home stadium: Pritchett Field

1961 Lone Star Conference football standings
	Conf.					Overall
Team	W		L		T	W		L		T
Sam Houston State $	7	–	0	–	0	8	–	1	–	0
Texas A&I	5	–	2	–	0	7	–	2	–	0
Lamar Tech	4	–	2	–	1	8	–	2	–	1
Howard Payne	4	–	3	–	0	4	–	5	–	0
East Texas State	3	–	4	–	0	4	–	6	–	0
Southwest Texas State	2	–	4	–	1	4	–	5	–	1
Sul Ross	1	–	6	–	0	3	–	7	–	0
Stephen F. Austin	1	–	6	–	0	1	–	9	–	0
$ – Conference champion

The 1961 Sam Houston State Bearkats football team was an American football team that represented Sam Houston State Teachers College (now known as Sam Houston State University) as a member of the Lone Star Conference (LSC) during the 1961 college football season. In their tenth year under head coach Paul Pierce, the Bearkats compiled an 8–1 record (7–0 in conference games), won the LSC championship, and outscored opponents by a total of 154 to 73.

The team played its home games at Pritchett Field in Huntsville, Texas.

== Schedule ==
Date	Opponent	Site	Result	Attendance	Source
September 16	Louisiana College*	Pritchett Field; Huntsville, TX	L 3–17	5,500	
September 23	at Corpus Christi*	UCC Stadium; Corpus Christi, TX	W 13–6		
October 7	Howard Payne	Pritchett Field; Huntsville, TX	W 10–6	4,500	
October 14	at East Texas State	Memorial Stadium; Commerce, TX	W 14–0		
October 21	No. 7 Texas A&I	Pritchett Field; Huntsville, TX	W 28–14	7,500	
October 28	at Southwest Texas State	Evans Field; San Marcos, TX	W 9–7	5,000–6,000	
November 4	Sul Ross	Pritchett Field; Huntsville, TX	W 27–0	5,500	
November 11	at Stephen F. Austin	Memorial Stadium; Nacogdoches, TX (rivalry)	W 41–16	5,500	
November 18	Lamar Tech	Pritchett Field; Huntsville, TX	W 9–7	7,300–7,500	
*Non-conference game; Rankings from AP Poll released prior to the game

== Statistics ==
The Bearkats gained 2,337 yards of total offense (259.7 per game), consisting of 1,578 rushing yards (175.3 per game) and 759 passing yards (84.3 per game). On defense, they held opponents to 1,603 yards (178.1 per game), including 997 rushing yard (110.8 per game) and 606 passing yards (67.3 per game).

The team was led on offense by quarterbacks Calvin Pope and Ken Wigington. Pope led the team in passing (32-for-55, 363 passing yards, three touchdowns, six interceptions) and scoring (58 points, three touchdowns, 16 extra point kicks, eight field goals). Wigington led the team with 435 yards of total offense, consisting of 312 passing yards and 123 rushing yards.

The team's leading rushers were Eliseo Villareal (356 yards, 86 carries) and Sammy McDonald (285 yards, 56 carries).

The leading receivers were halfbacks Larry May (12 receptions, 163 yards) and Eliseo Villareal (11 receptions, 106 yards).

Dave Smith was the team's punter. He had 40 punts for a 34.3-yard average.

== Awards and honors ==
Two Sam Houston players received first-team honors on the 1961 All-Lone Star Conference football team: tackle Walter Dollar and guard Steve Shaver. Two others were named to the second team: halfback Eliseo Villareal and end Henry Adair. Five others received honorable mention: quarterback Calvin Pope; halfbacks Sammy McDonald and Larry May; fullback Albert Thompson; and center Pat Derrick.
