= 1954 Tangerine Bowl =

American college football game

East Texas State Lions	Arkansas State Indians
(10–0)	(8–0–1)
Lone Star Conference	Independent
7	7
Head coach: Milburn Smith	Head coach: Forrest England
	1	2	3	4	Total
East Texas State	0	0	0	7	7
Arkansas State	7	0	0	0	7
- Date: January 1, 1954
- Season: 1953
- Stadium: Tangerine Bowl
- Location: Orlando, Florida
- MVP: Bobby Spann, Arkansas State
- Attendance: 12,976

The 1954 Tangerine Bowl was an American college football bowl game played after the 1953 season, on January 1, 1954, at the Tangerine Bowl stadium in Orlando, Florida. The Arkansas State Indians (now the Arkansas State Red Wolves) tied the East Texas State Lions (now the East Texas A&M–Lions) by a score of 7–7.

== Game summary ==
The first quarter saw the first score of the game, as Bobby Spann found James Turley on a 20-yard pass for an Arkansas State touchdown. That proved to be the only scoring of the quarter, which finished 7–0. The second quarter and third quarter were scoreless. The scoring drought was ended in the fourth quarter by East Texas State's Billy Ray Norris, on a 1-yard rush. The extra point tied the game at 7–7, and neither team managed to score again.

== Aftermath ==
The tie ended a streak of 29 consecutive victories by East Texas State. Arkansas State quarterback Bobby Spann was selected as MVP of the game.

This game was the second tie in Tangerine Bowl history (the first having been the 1949 game), and the third-lowest scoring behind the 1948 game between Catawba and Marshall (finished 7–0) and the 1950 game between Emory & Henry and St. Vincent (finished 7–6). The game's third-place position was soon overtaken, though, as Omaha and Eastern Kentucky finished 7–6 the next year and Juniata and Missouri Valley tied 6–6 the year after that, which put the 1954 edition at the fifth-lowest scoring Tangerine Bowl, a position it maintains to present day (throughout all name-changes and variations of the bowl).

== Scoring summary ==
Scoring summary

Quarter	Time	Drive			Team	Scoring information	Score	
Quarter	Time	Plays	Yards	TOP	Team	Scoring information	East Texas St.	Arkansas St.
1	4:50	3	25		Ark. St.	James Turley 20-yard touchdown reception from Bobby Spann, Ness Sechrest kick good	0	7
4	9:00	9	61		E. Tex. St.	Billy Ray Norris 1-yard touchdown run, George Riley kick good	7	7
"TOP" = time of possession. For other American football terms, see Glossary of American football.							7	7

== Statistics ==
Statistics	Arkansas State	East Texas State
First downs	8	19
Rushing yards	181	184
Passes attempted	4	29
Passes completed	1	9
Passes intercepted by	2	0
Passing yards	20	83
Yards penalized	20	30
Punts–average	9–30.2	4–38.0
Fumbles lost	0	3
