= 1953 East Texas State Lions football team =

American college football season

1953 East Texas State Lions football

LSC champion

Tangerine Bowl, T 7–7 vs. Arkansas State
- Conference: Lone Star Conference
- Record: 10–0–1 (5–0 LSC)
- Head coach: Milburn Smith (3rd season)
- Home stadium: Memorial Stadium

1953 Lone Star Conference football standings
	Conf.					Overall
Team	W		L		T	W		L		T
East Texas State $	5	–	0	–	0	10	–	0	–	1
Sam Houston State	4	–	1	–	0	9	–	1	–	0
Southwest Texas State	3	–	2	–	0	5	–	4	–	0
Lamar Tech	2	–	3	–	0	3	–	7	–	0
Sul Ross	1	–	4	–	0	4	–	7	–	0
Stephen F. Austin	0	–	5	–	0	1	–	8	–	0
$ – Conference champion

The 1953 East Texas State Lions football team was an American football team that represented East Texas State Teachers College—now known as East Texas A&M University–as a member of the Lone Star Conference (LSC) during the 1953 college football season. Led by Milburn Smith in his third and final season as head coach, the Lions compiled an overall record of 10–0–1 with a mark of 5–0 in conference play, winning the LSC title. East Texas State was invited to the Tangerine Bowl, where the Lions tied Arkansas State.

== Schedule ==
Date	Time	Opponent	Site	Result	Attendance	Source
September 19	8:00 p.m.	Abilene Christian*	Memorial Stadium; Commerce, TX	W 28–27	7,500	
September 26		at Trinity (TX)*	Alamo Stadium; San Antonio, TX	W 20–19	5,000	
October 3		at Southwestern Louisiana*	McNaspy Stadium; Lafayette, LA	W 41–7	7,500	
October 10		Lamar Tech	Memorial Stadium; Commerce, TX	W 32–13		
October 16		at Chattanooga*	Chamberlain Field; Chattanooga, TN	W 19–7		
October 24		at Sam Houston State	Pritchett Field; Huntsville, TX	W 32–6	4,000	
October 31		Northwestern Oklahoma State*	Memorial Stadium; Commerce, TX	W 80–0		
November 7		Stephen F. Austin	Memorial Stadium; Commerce, TX	W 39–0		
November 14	8:00 p.m.	at Southwest Texas State	Evans Field; San Marcos, TX	W 40–19		
November 21		at Sul Ross	Alpine, TX	W 27–7		
January 1		vs. Arkansas State*	Tangerine Bowl; Orlando, FL (Tangerine Bowl)	T 7–7	12,976	
*Non-conference game; All times are in Central time
