= Milburn Smith =

American football and basketball coach (1912–1994)

Biographical details
- Born: July 24, 1912; Titus County, Texas, U.S.
- Died: November 29, 1994; Waco, Texas, U.S.

Coaching career (HC unless noted)
- 1936–1942: Carey HS (TX)
- 1943–1950: Mount Vernon HS (TX)
- 1951–1953: East Texas State
- 1954–1958: Longview HS (TX)

Head coaching record
- Overall: 30–2–1 (college)
- Bowls: 1–0–1

Accomplishments and honors

Championships
- 3 LSC (1951–1953)

Milburn Albert "Catfish" Smith (July 24, 1912 – November 29, 1994) was an American football and basketball coach in the state of Texas.

Smith began his coaching career in rural West Texas, where in 1936 he led Carey High, a school with less than one hundred enrollment and no basketball court, to a fourth-place finish in the Texas Schoolboy state basketball tournament, including a twenty-six-game winning streak. He followed that with a 50–2 season and the state championship, back when the smallest schools competed against the largest for the coveted title.

In 1943 he was called to Mount Vernon, Texas to temporarily fill a coaching vacancy. Seven years later, with two hundred fourteen victories and over twenty titles, including district, bi-district, regional, and state crowns, he was one of the most recognized high school coaches in the state of Texas. His football teams won four regional titles, a state finalist, a state championship, and ten district crowns in seven years with a record of 60–5–1. In 1948 he became the only Texas high school coach to ever go undefeated in football and basketball in the same academic year, as Mt. Vernon won the 1-A state basketball championship at 30–0 and won the regional (as far as 1-A went in 1948) in football at 11–0.

In 1951, East Texas State (now East Texas A&M University) named Smith their new head football coach. He guided the Lions to a 30–2–1 record, including a 29-game winning streak starting in October 1951 and ending in 1953 that brought them invitations to the 1953 and 1954 Tangerine Bowl in Orlando, Florida.

Despite his success in the collegiate ranks, Smith chose to return to high school coaching, as he became head coach at Longview High School in 1954. Smith guided the Longview Lobos to a 27–16–6 record in four seasons.

Smith has been inducted into four halls of fame, including the Texas Sports Hall of Fame. He was a member of the inaugural class of the Texas A&M–Commerce / East Texas State Athletic Hall of Fame in 1978.

== Political career ==
Smith served as a Waco, Texas city councilman from 1973 through 1977 and as mayor of Waco in 1976.

== Head coaching record ==
=== Football ===
Year	Team	Overall	Conference	Standing	Bowl/playoffs
East Texas State Lions (Lone Star Conference) (1951–1953)
1951	East Texas State	9–2	5–0	1st	
1952	East Texas State	11–0	5–0	1st	W Tangerine
1953	East Texas State	10–0–1	5–0	1st	T Tangerine
East Texas State:		30–2–1	15–0		
Total:		30–2–1			
National championship Conference title Conference division title or championship game berth
