= 1961 Tangerine Bowl =

American college football game

| Lamar Tech Cardinals | Middle Tennessee Blue Raiders |
| (7–2–1) | (7–3) |
| Lone Star Conference | Ohio Valley Conference |
| 21 | 14 |
| Head coach: James B. Higgins | Head coach: Charles M. Murphy |
| | 1 | 2 | 3 | 4 | Total |
|---|---|---|---|---|---|
| Lamar Tech | 7 | 7 | 0 | 7 | 21 |
| Middle Tennessee | 0 | 0 | 6 | 8 | 14 |
- Date: December 29, 1961
- Season: 1961
- Stadium: Tangerine Bowl
- Location: Orlando, Florida
- MVP: Ralph Stone, Lamar
- Attendance: 6,000

The 1961 Tangerine Bowl was held on December 29, 1961 at the Tangerine Bowl stadium in Orlando, Florida. The Lamar Tech Cardinals defeated the Middle Tennessee Blue Raiders by a score of 21–14.

The scoring opened with a Lamar Tech touchdown on a 52-yard rush by quarterback Win Herbert, and that play proved to be the only scoring in the first quarter, which ended 7–0. The second quarter's only scoring came when Middle Tennessee fumbled the ball in their own end zone and Lamar Tech recovered to lead 14–0 at halftime. Middle Tennessee finally found the end zone in the third quarter, scoring on a 32-yard pass but failing the two-point conversion to make it 14–6 at the end of the third quarter. Lamar Tech later extended their lead to 21–6 after a 3-yard pass for a touchdown. The last score of the game came from Middle Tennessee, who scored a touchdown plus a two-point conversion to end the game 21–14.

At the end of the game, Lamar Tech had two more first downs, 73 more rushing yards, and 66 more total yards. However, Middle Tennessee out-passed Lamar by 6 yards. Lamar Tech halfback Ralph Stone was named the game's most valuable player.
