= 2014 Hawaii Bowl =

- 13th Hawaii Bowl
Fresno State Bulldogs	Rice Owls
(6–7)	(7–5)
Mountain West	C-USA
6	30
Head coach: Tim DeRuyter	Head coach: David Bailiff
	1	2	3	4	Total
Fresno State	3	3	0	0	6
Rice	16	0	7	7	30
- Date: December 24, 2014
- Season: 2014
- Stadium: Aloha Stadium
- Location: Honolulu (Halawa), Hawaii
- MVP: Rice QB Driphus Jackson; Fresno State LB Carl Mickelsen
- Favorite: Even
- Referee: Tony Backert (Sun Belt)
- Attendance: 25,365
- Payout: US$650,000

United States TV coverage
- Network: ESPN/ESPN Radio
- Announcers: Allen Bestwick, Rod Gilmore, & Holly Rowe (ESPN); Kevin Winter & Trevor Matich (ESPN Radio)

The 2014 Hawaii Bowl was a college football bowl game played on December 24, 2014, at Aloha Stadium in Honolulu, Hawaii in the United States. The thirteenth annual Hawaii Bowl, it pitted the Fresno State Bulldogs of the Mountain West Conference against the Rice Owls of Conference USA. It was one of the 2014–15 bowl games that concluded the 2014 FBS football season. The game started at 3:00 p.m. HST and aired on ESPN.

Rice defeated Fresno State by a score of 30–6.

== Teams ==
The game featured the Fresno State Bulldogs of the Mountain West Conference against the Rice Owls of Conference USA.

This was the seventh overall meeting between these two teams, with Fresno State having won all 6 previous games. The last time these two teams had met was in 2004.

=== Fresno State Bulldogs ===
Despite finishing their regular season with a 6–7 record, by virtue of winning the Mountain West's West Division title, the Bulldogs became bowl eligible and accepted their invitation to play in the game. This was Fresno State's second Hawaii Bowl; the Bulldogs had previously appeared in the 2012 game, losing to the SMU Mustangs by a score of 43–10 largely due to the efforts of SMU defensive end Margus Hunt.

=== Rice Owls ===
After finishing their regular season with a 7–5 record, the Owls accepted their invitation to play in the game, their first appearance in the Hawaii Bowl. Although they began the season with three losses, the Owls won their next six games before losing two of their final three; overall, according to FBSchedules.com, Rice had the 12th easiest schedule in the Football Bowl Subdivision (FBS).

== Pregame buildup ==
=== Fresno State ===
==== Offense ====
Featuring reasonable balance between a rushing game that averaged 183.9 yards per game (45th nationally) and a passing game that averaged 233.8 yards per game (59th nationally), Fresno State's offense scored an average of 28.1 points per game. The aforementioned rushing attack was led by junior Marteze Waller, a second team all-conference selection whose 1292 rushing yards and 11 touchdowns were complemented by the efforts of senior Josh Quezada and quarterback Brian Burrell, who combined for 801 rushing yards and eight touchdowns. Burrell orchestrated a passing attack that frequently targeted first team all-conference selection Josh Harper, a senior who enjoyed "quite the career" at Fresno State having exceeded the 1,000 yard threshold and ranking among the leaders in touchdown receptions nationally; he compiled twice as many receptions as anyone else on the roster. Wide receivers Aaron Peck, Greg Watson, and Delvon Hardaway, running back Josh Quezada, and tight end Chad Olsen also made contributions to the passing game. Right guard Cody Wichmann, who frequently drew comparisons to Logan Mankins, anchored the Bulldogs' offensive line, and was set to make his 50th consecutive start in the bowl game; he earned second team all-conference accolades. Alex Fifita started at left tackle, having earned honorable mention all-conference recognition after proving himself at the position during the season.

==== Defense ====
Junior defensive tackle Tyeler Davison anchored the defense, having totaled eight sacks and 12.5 tackles-for-loss, and received first team all-conference recognition. Outside linebacker Donavan Lewis, a senior mainstay of the defense, earned honorable mention all-conference recognition, and received accolade from teammates for always understanding his assignments and playing with heart. One game preview commented, "Fresno State's secondary wasn't always tested in a run-heavy Mountain West Conference, but they gave up 14 touchdowns against zero interceptions in their opening three-game stretch against Power Five opponents." Nevertheless, the aforementioned secondary did place one of its members on the first team all-conference squad, three-time honoree Derron Smith.

=== Rice ===
==== Offense ====
Relatively similar to Fresno State's, Rice's offensive statistical averages included 223.6 passing yards per game (71st nationally), 170.3 rushing yards per game (57th nationally), and 28.7 points per game (68th nationally). Likely employing an offensive scheme that emphasized ball control, the Owls' offense featured three competent rushers – Jowan Davis and Darik Dillard at running back, and dual-threat quarterback Driphus Jackson. Jackson's top target at receiver was senior Jordan Taylor, the "star of the Owls offense" whose 49 receptions and 781 yards both led the team. Fellow senior Mario Hull led the team with eight touchdown receptions. Offensive lineman Nico Carlson helped lead the senior class at Rice in establishing a winning culture in Rice football; he also earned placement on the second team all-conference team. Andrew Reue and Matt Simonette – two of Carlson's fellow offensive linemen – also earned all-conference recognition as honorable mentions.

==== Defense ====
"Fresh off an absolutely embarrassing performance" in which they surrendered 76 points and 677 total yards, Rice's defense looked to rebound by notching a "competent" performance against Fresno State. Continuity was a prevalent theme in the Owls' secondary, in which three of four starters – cornerback Bryce Callahan and safeties Malcolm Hill and Julius White – joined linebacker James Radcliffe as the only defensive players in Rice history to start three bowls in their college careers. Up front, lanky defensive end Brian Nordstrom "came out of nowhere to have one of the best seasons for a defensive end in Rice history," posting an "eye-opening," Conference USA-leading 18.5 tackles for loss to complement 7.5 sacks en route to earning first team all-conference accolades. Callahan also earned second team all-conference recognition while White, Radcliffe, and linebacker Alex Lyons received honorable mention recognition.

== Game summary ==
=== Scoring summary ===
Scoring summary

Quarter	Time	Drive			Team	Scoring information	Score	
Quarter	Time	Plays	Yards	TOP	Team	Scoring information	FS	Rice
1	10:32	11	71	4:28	Rice	21-yard field goal by James Hairston	0	3
1	2:16	10	37	3:11	FS	44-yard field goal by Kody Kroening	3	3
1	0:23	5	78	1:48	Rice	Jordan Taylor 14-yard touchdown reception from Driphus Jackson, James Hairston kick failed	3	9
1	0:04	1	69	0:11	Rice	Mario Hull 69-yard touchdown reception from Driphus Jackson, James Hairston kick good	3	16
2	8:53	10	51	2:43	FS	40-yard field goal by Kody Kroening	6	16
3	6:18	7	73	2:48	Rice	Dennis Parks 40-yard touchdown reception from Driphus Jackson, James Hairston kick good	6	23
4	10:07	2	59	0:27	Rice	Darik Dillard 1-yard touchdown run, James Hairston kick good	6	30
"TOP" = time of possession. For other American football terms, see Glossary of American football.							6	30

=== Statistics ===
Statistics	FS	Rice
First downs	15	16
Plays–yards	80–255	66–463
Rushes–yards	42–162	40–137
Passing yards	93	326
Passing: Comp–Att–Int	17–38–2	16–26–0
Time of possession	27:45	32:15
