= 2019 Tarleton State Texans football team =

American college football season

2019 Tarleton State Texans football
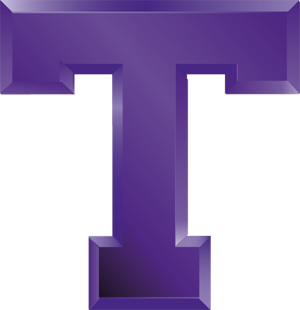

LSC champion

NCAA Division II First Round, L 16–23 vs. Texas A&M–Commerce
- Conference: Lone Star Conference
- Record: 11–1 (8–0 LSC)
- Head coach: Todd Whitten (10th season)
- Offensive coordinator: Jonathan Beasley (3rd season)
- Offensive scheme: Spread
- Defensive coordinator: Marcus Patton (4th season)
- Base defense: 4–3
- Home stadium: Memorial Stadium

2019 Lone Star Conference football standings
| | Conf. | | | Overall |
| Team | W | | L | W | | L |
|---|---|---|---|---|---|---|
| No. 9 Tarleton State $^ | 8 | – | 0 | 11 | – | 1 |
| No. 11 Texas A&M–Commerce ^ | 7 | – | 1 | 10 | – | 3 |
| Angelo State | 5 | – | 3 | 8 | – | 3 |
| West Texas A&M | 5 | – | 3 | 8 | – | 3 |
| Eastern New Mexico # | 4 | – | 4 | 8 | – | 4 |
| Midwestern State | 3 | – | 5 | 5 | – | 6 |
| UT Permian Basin | 2 | – | 6 | 4 | – | 7 |
| Texas A&M–Kingsville | 1 | – | 7 | 2 | – | 9 |
| Western New Mexico | 1 | – | 7 | 1 | – | 10 |
$ – Conference champion; ^ – NCAA Division II playoff participant; # – Heritage Bowl participant; Rankings from AFCA Coaches poll

The 2019 Tarleton State Texans football team represented Tarleton State University in the 2019 NCAA Division II football season. They were led by head coach Todd Whitten, who is in his 10th season at Tarleton State. The Texans played their home games at Memorial Stadium and were members of the Lone Star Conference (LSC).

This was the last season the Texans competed as members of the LSC and at the NCAA Division II level.

== Schedule ==
Tarleton State announced their 2019 football schedule on April 30, 2019.

| Date | Time | Opponent | Rank | Site | Result | Attendance |
|---|---|---|---|---|---|---|
| September 7 | 6:00 p.m | at Stephen F. Austin* | No. 7 | Homer Bryce Stadium; Nacogdoches, TX | W 37–26 | 8,334 |
| September 14 | 6:00 p.m | Doane* | No. 5 | Memorial Stadium; Stephenville, TX | W 56–3 | 8,361 |
| September 21 | 6:00 p.m | West Texas A&M | No. 4 | Memorial Stadium; Stephenville, TX | W 58–28 | 10,691 |
| September 28 | 7:00 p.m | at UT Permian Basin | No. 4 | Ratliff Stadium; Odessa, TX | W 49–7 | 4,707 |
| October 5 | 6:00 p.m | No. 23 Angelo State | No. 4 | Memorial Stadium; Stephenville, TX | W 30–13 | 7,716 |
| October 12 | 7:00 p.m | at Eastern New Mexico | No. 4 | Greyhound Stadium; Portales, NM | W 49–10 | 1,700 |
| October 19 | 6:00 p.m | No. 20 Texas A&M–Commerce^{†} | No. 4 | Memorial Stadium; Stephenville, TX | W 35–21 | 11,513 |
| October 26 | 7:00 p.m | at Texas A&M–Kingsville | No. 4 | Javelina Stadium; Kingsville, TX | W 45–33 | 6,044 |
| November 2 | 2:00 p.m | Midwestern State | No. 4 | Memorial Stadium; Stephenville, TX | W 66–7 | 7,216 |
| November 9 | 1:00 p.m | at William Jewell* | No. 3 | Greene Stadium; Liberty, MO | W 58–3 | 580 |
| November 16 | 1:00 p.m | at Western New Mexico | No. 3 | Altamirano Stadium; Silver City, NM | W 41–24 | 520 |
| November 23 | 1:00 p.m | No. 21 Texas A&M–Commerce* | No. 3 | Memorial Stadium; Stephenville, TX (NCAA Division II First Round) | L 16–23 | 8,214 |
*Non-conference game; ^{†}Homecoming; Rankings from American Football Coaches Association Poll released prior to the game
