= 1961 Lamar Tech Cardinals football team =

American college football season

1961 Lamar Tech Cardinals football

Tangerine Bowl champion

Tangerine Bowl, W 21–14 vs. Middle Tennessee
- Conference: Lone Star Conference
- Record: 8–2–1 (4–2–1 LSC)
- Head coach: James B. Higgins (9th season)
- Home stadium: Greenie Stadium

1961 Lone Star Conference football standings
	Conf.					Overall
Team	W		L		T	W		L		T
Sam Houston State $	7	–	0	–	0	8	–	1	–	0
Texas A&I	5	–	2	–	0	7	–	2	–	0
Lamar Tech	4	–	2	–	1	8	–	2	–	1
Howard Payne	4	–	3	–	0	4	–	5	–	0
East Texas State	3	–	4	–	0	4	–	6	–	0
Southwest Texas State	2	–	4	–	1	4	–	5	–	1
Sul Ross	1	–	6	–	0	3	–	7	–	0
Stephen F. Austin	1	–	6	–	0	1	–	9	–	0
$ – Conference champion

The 1961 Lamar Tech Cardinals football team represented Lamar State College of Technology—now known as Lamar University—as a member of the Lone Star Conference (LSC) during the 1961 college football season. Led by ninth-year head coach James B. Higgins, the Cardinals compiled an overall record of an 8–2–1 with a mark of 4–2–1 in conference play, placing third in the LSC. Lamar Tech was invited to the Tangerine Bowl, where the beat Middle Tennessee, 21–14.

Back Bobby Jancik received first-team honors on the 1961 Little All-America college football team.

== Schedule ==
Date	Opponent	Rank	Site	Result	Attendance	Source
September 23	Northeast Louisiana State*		Greenie Stadium; Beaumont, TX	W 38–34	7,000–7,100	
September 30	at Abilene Christian*		Shotwell Stadium; Abilene, TX	W 25–10	10,000	
October 7	Stephen F. Austin		Greenie Stadium; Beaumont, TX	W 34–22	7,600	
October 14	Sul Ross		Greenie Stadium; Beaumont, TX	W 34–0	7,200	
October 21	Southwest Texas State	No. 9	Evans Field; San Marcos, TX	T 7–7	4,500–5,100	
October 28	Howard Payne^{†}		Greenie Stadium; Beaumont, TX	W 33–13	9,000	
November 4	at Texas A&I	No. T–10	Javelina Stadium; Kingsville, TX	L 7–8	6,500	
November 11	East Texas State		Greenie Stadium; Beaumont, TX	W 14–7	7,000	
November 18	Sam Houston State		Pritchett Field; Huntsville, TX	L 7–9	7,300	
December 2	at Mexico Polytechical Institute*		Estadio Olímpico Universitario; Mexico City, Mexico	W 62–22	20,000	
December 29	vs. Middle Tennessee*		Tangerine Bowl; Orlando, FL (Tangerine Bowl)	W 21–14	6,000	
*Non-conference game; ^{†}Homecoming; Rankings from AP Poll released prior to the game
