= Billy Riebock =

American football player and coach (born c. 1984)

Current position
- Title: Head coach
- Team: Millikin
- Conference: CCIW
- Record: 3–7

Biographical details
- Born: c. 1984 (age 41–42); Decatur, Illinois, U.S.
- Education: Quincy University (2006)

Playing career
- 2002–2005: Quincy
- Position: Quarterback

Coaching career (HC unless noted)
- 2006: St. Francis (IL) (WR)
- 2007: Indiana (OQC)
- 2008–2011: Quincy (OC/QB)
- 2012–2013: Ball State (GA)
- 2014–2016: Elon (WR)
- 2017: Rice (OQC)
- 2018: Bridgewater (OC/QB)
- 2019–2022: Texas A&M–Commerce (OC/QB)
- 2023–2024: Midwestern State (OC/QB)
- 2025–present: Millikin

Head coaching record
- Overall: 3–7

William Riebock (born c. 1984) is an American college football coach. He is the head football coach for Millikin University, a position he has held since 2025. He also coached for St. Francis (IL), Indiana, Quincy, Ball State, Elon, Rice, Bridgewater, Texas A&M–Commerce, and Midwestern State. He played college football for Quincy as a quarterback.

== Head coaching record ==
Year	Team	Overall	Conference	Standing	Bowl/playoffs
Millikin Big Blue (College Conference of Illinois and Wisconsin) (2025–present)
2025	Millikin	3–7	2–7	T–8th	
2026	Millikin	0–0	0–0		
Millikin:		3–7	2–7		
Total:		3–7			
