= 1956 Southwest Texas State Bobcats football team =

American college football season

1956 Southwest Texas State Bobcats football
- Conference: Lone Star Conference
- Record: 6–3 (4–2 LSC)
- Head coach: R. W. Parker (3rd season)
- Home stadium: Evans Field

1956 Lone Star Conference football standings
	Conf.					Overall
Team	W		L		T	W		L		T
Sam Houston State $	6	–	0	–	0	10	–	0	–	0
Texas A&I	5	–	1	–	0	7	–	3	–	0
Southwest Texas State	4	–	2	–	0	6	–	3	–	0
Stephen F. Austin	3	–	3	–	0	4	–	6	–	0
Lamar Tech	2	–	4	–	0	4	–	4	–	1
East Texas State	1	–	5	–	0	2	–	8	–	0
Sul Ross	0	–	6	–	0	1	–	9	–	0
$ – Conference champion

The 1956 Southwest Texas State Bobcats football team was an American football team that represented Southwest Texas State Teachers College (now known as Texas State University) during the 1956 college football season as a member of the Lone Star Conference (LSC). In their third year under head coach R. W. Parker, the team compiled an overall record of 6–3 with a mark of 4–2 in conference play.

== Schedule ==
Date	Opponent	Site	Result	Source
September 22	Texas Lutheran*	Evans Field; San Marcos, TX	W 19–6	
September 29	at Howard Payne*	Lion Stadium; Brownwood, TX	W 13–6	
October 6	at Texas A&I	Javelina Stadium; Kingsville, TX	L 14–23	
October 13	Sul Ross	Evans Field; San Marcos, TX	W 27–0	
October 20	Stephen F. Austin	Evans Field; San Marcos, TX	W 32–6	
October 27	at Abilene Christian*	Fair Park Stadium; Abilene, TX	L 0–26	
November 3	Lamar Tech	Evans Field; San Marcos, TX	W 13–6	
November 10	at Sam Houston State	Pritchett Field; Huntsville, TX (rivalry)	L 0–28	
November 17	at East Texas State	Memorial Stadium; Commerce, TX	W 14–0	
*Non-conference game
