= 1953 Southwest Texas State Bobcats football team =

American college football season

1953 Southwest Texas State Bobcats football
- Conference: Lone Star Conference
- Record: 5–4 (3–2 LSC)
- Head coach: Milton Jowers (3rd season)
- Home stadium: Evans Field

1953 Lone Star Conference football standings
	Conf.					Overall
Team	W		L		T	W		L		T
East Texas State $	5	–	0	–	0	10	–	0	–	1
Sam Houston State	4	–	1	–	0	9	–	1	–	0
Southwest Texas State	3	–	2	–	0	5	–	4	–	0
Lamar Tech	2	–	3	–	0	3	–	7	–	0
Sul Ross	1	–	4	–	0	4	–	7	–	0
Stephen F. Austin	0	–	5	–	0	1	–	8	–	0
$ – Conference champion

The 1953 Southwest Texas State Bobcats football team was an American football team that represented Southwest Texas State Teachers College (now known as Texas State University) during the 1953 college football season as a member of the Lone Star Conference (LSC). In their third year under head coach Milton Jowers, the team compiled an overall record of 5–4 with a mark of 3–2 in conference play.

== Schedule ==
Date	Opponent	Site	Result	Source
September 12	at Abilene Christian*	Fair Park Stadium; Abilene, TX	L 19–26	
September 19	at Trinity (TX)*	Alamo Stadium; San Antonio, TX	L 21–40	
September 26	Texas A&I*	Evans Field; San Marcos, TX	W 34–20	
October 10	at Sul Ross	Jackson Field; Alpine, TX	W 33–13	
October 17	at Stephen F. Austin	Memorial Stadium; Nacogdoches, TX	W 34–7	
October 24	Howard Payne*	Evans Field; San Marcos, TX	W 54–13	
October 31	at Lamar Tech	Greenie Stadium; Beaumont, TX	W 14–6	
November 7	Sam Houston State	Evans Field; San Marcos, TX (rivalry)	L 13–21	
November 14	East Texas State	Evans Field; San Marcos, TX	L 19–40	
*Non-conference game
