= David Bailiff =

American football player and coach (born 1958)

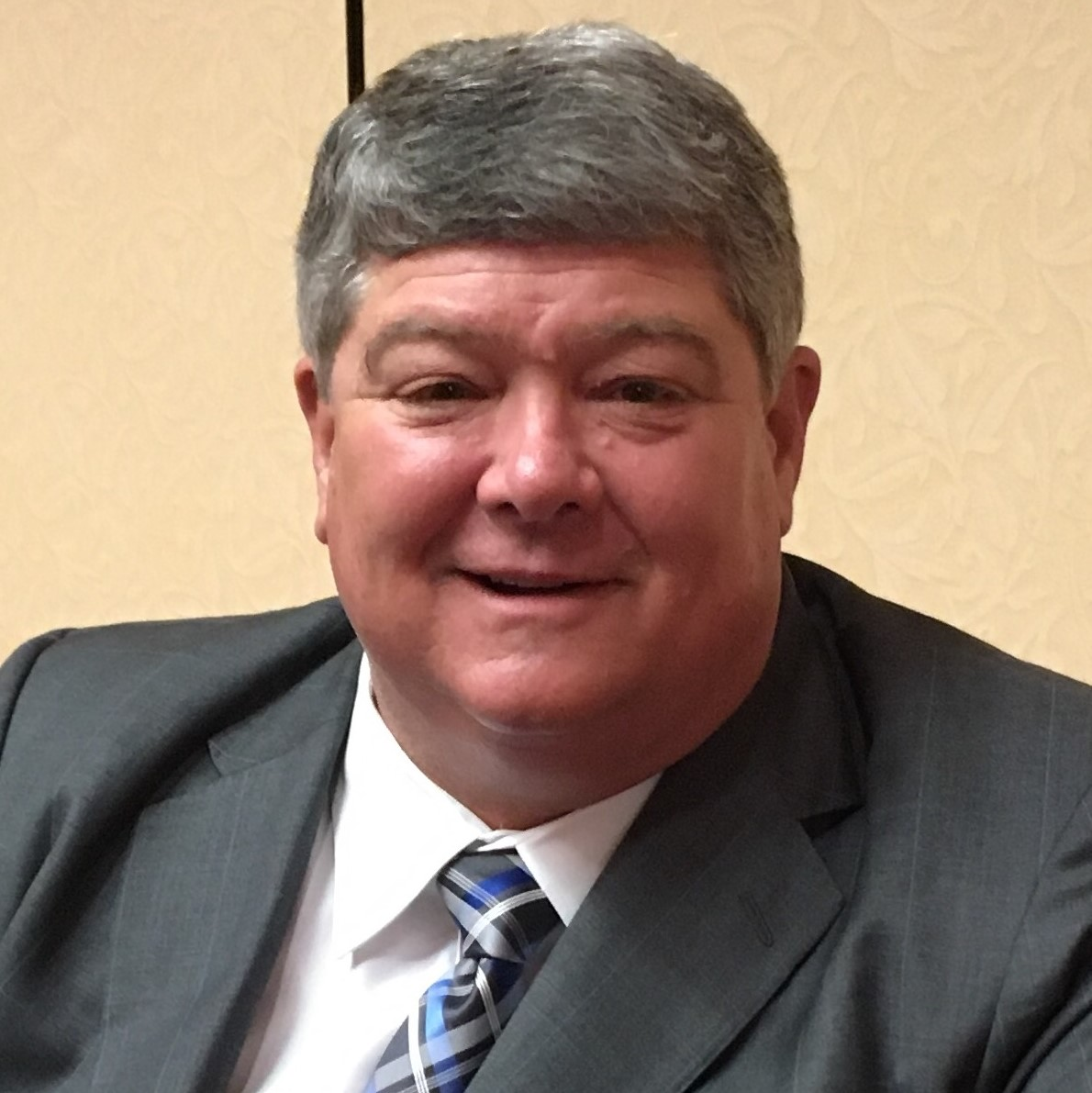
- Bailiff at 2017 C-USA Media Days

Current position
- Title: Special assistant to the head coach
- Team: Texas State
- Conference: Sun Belt

Biographical details
- Born: May 26, 1958 (age 68); Dallas, Texas, U.S.

Playing career
- 1977–1980: Southwest Texas State
- Position: Offensive lineman

Coaching career (HC unless noted)
- 1982–1984: New Braunfels HS (TX) (DL)
- 1988: Southwest Texas State (GA)
- 1989–1991: Southwest Texas State (DL)
- 1992–1996: New Mexico (DL/RC)
- 1997–1999: Southwest Texas State (DC)
- 2000: Southwest Texas State (AHC/DC)
- 2001: TCU (AHC/DL)
- 2002–2003: TCU (DC/DL)
- 2004–2006: Texas State
- 2007–2017: Rice
- 2019–2022: Texas A&M–Commerce
- 2023–present: Texas State (spec. asst. to the HC)

Head coaching record
- Overall: 101–108
- Bowls: 3–1
- Tournaments: 2–1 (NCAA D-I-AA Playoffs); 2–1 (NCAA Division II Playoffs)

Accomplishments and honors

Championships
- 1 Southland (2005); 1 C-USA (2013); 2 C-USA West Division (2008, 2013)

Awards
- 2× C-USA Coach of the Year (2008, 2013)

David Edward Bailiff (born May 26, 1958) is an American football coach and former player. He was most recently the head coach at Texas A&M University–Commerce from 2019 to 2022; prior to that he was the head coach at Rice University in Houston, Texas from 2007 to 2017. During his tenure as head coach, the Rice Owls played in four bowl games, winning three of them, and won the 2013 Conference USA football championship, the first outright conference title for Rice in 56 years. He also coached at his alma mater, Texas State University, where he led the Bobcats to the NCAA Division I-AA National Semifinals in 2005.

== Playing career ==
Bailiff played for three years as an offensive lineman and tight end for coach Jim Wacker at Southwest Texas State University in San Marcos, Texas. As a senior in 1980, he was team captain.

== Coaching career ==
=== Early coaching career ===
After graduating in 1981, Bailiff's first coaching job was in the high school ranks in New Braunfels, Texas. After three years coaching the defensive line at New Braunfels High School, he left coaching and entered the private sector for four years. He returned to coaching in 1988 as a graduate assistant at Southwest Texas and was promoted the next year to a full-time position that he held until he was hired to coach the defensive line at the University of New Mexico by Lobos' head coach Dennis Franchione. In 1997, Bailiff returned to Southwest Texas as the defensive coordinator. In 2001, he was hired to serve in the same role at TCU by coach Gary Patterson. Following the 2002 season, in which the Horned Frogs' defense, led by All-American linebacker LaMarcus McDonald, ranked 2nd in the nation, Bailiff was named the nation's Top Assistant Coach by the All American Football Foundation.

=== Texas State ===
On February 5, 2004, Bailiff again returned to his alma mater, which by now was known as Texas State University, this time as head coach. In his first season as the Bobcats' head coach, he guided them to a 5–6 record. In 2005, they finished the regular season 9–2 and were Southland Conference Champions. They then won two games in the NCAA Division I-AA playoffs, eventually losing to Northern Iowa. In 2006, the Bobcats were again 5–6.

=== Rice ===
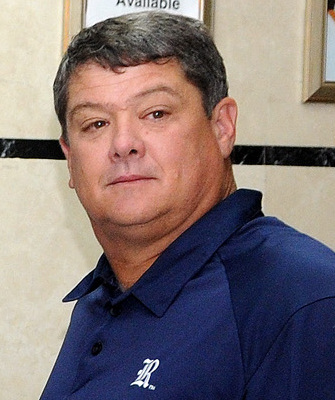
Bailiff in 2009

On January 19, 2007, Rice University hired Bailiff as head coach, replacing Todd Graham. In 2008, he led Rice to a 9–3 record and an appearance in the 2008 Texas Bowl—only their second bowl appearance in 47 years. The Owls won that game 38–14 for Rice's first 10-win season since 1949, and Bailiff was rewarded with a five-year contract extension. In 2012, Rice returned to bowl action with a win over Air Force in the Armed Forces Bowl. The following season, Bailiff became the first coach in Rice history to record two 10-win seasons as Rice won its first outright conference championship since 1957 by defeating Marshall 41–24 and earning a berth in the Liberty Bowl. In 2014, Bailiff led the Owls to a third consecutive bowl game as Rice defeated Fresno State 30–3 in the Hawai'i Bowl.

In 2017, Bailiff was fired after the conclusion of a 1-11 season, his worst at Rice. His 57 wins are the second most in school history, behind only Hall of Famer Jess Neely.

=== Texas A&M–Commerce ===
On December 9, 2018, Bailiff was hired as the head coach at Texas A&M University–Commerce. He replaced Colby Carthel, who had been hired at Division I Stephen F. Austin State University. Bailiff was hired mainly due to his familiarity with the Lone Star Conference as a player, his relationship with Texas high school coaches, and having had success at schools that had traditionally not been football powers. Unlike his previous tenures at Rice and Texas State, Bailiff was taking over an A&M-Commerce program that had deep tradition and that was considered by most Division II football observers to be the best Division II program in Texas. In his first season at Texas A&M-Commerce, he led the Lions to an 11–3 record, finishing 2nd in the Lone Star Conference. The Lions went to the NCAA Division II playoffs for the fifth straight season. In the first round, they avenged their only conference loss by defeating # 3 and undefeated Tarleton State University, 23–16. In the second round, they defeated Rocky Mountain Athletic Conference Champion and previously undefeated Colorado School of Mines 23–3 to send them back to the Region 4 Championship for the second time in 3 years. They were defeated by # 4 Minnesota State-Mankato 42–21 to end their season at 11–3.

After the Lions decided not to compete in football in 2020 amid the COVID-19 pandemic, the Lions returned to play in 2021.

During Bailiff's second season, the Lions went 7–4 overall and 5–2 in Lone Star Conference Play. However, the Lions missed the playoffs for the first time since 2014.

In 2022, the Lions made the transition to Division I as a member of the Southland Conference. Bailiff stepped down after the 2022 season.

== Head coaching record ==
Year	Team	Overall	Conference	Standing	Bowl/playoffs	Coaches^{#}	TSN^{°}
Texas State Bobcats (Southland Conference) (2004–2006)
2004	Texas State	5–6	3–2	3rd			
2005	Texas State	11–3	5–1	T–1st	L NCAA Division I-AA Semifinal	4	4
2006	Texas State	5–6	3–3	4th			
Texas State:		21–15	11–6				
Rice Owls (Conference USA) (2007–2017)
2007	Rice	3–9	3–5	5th (West)			
2008	Rice	10–3	7–1	T–1st (West)	W Texas		
2009	Rice	2–10	2–6	T–5th (West)			
2010	Rice	4–8	3–5	T–4th (West)			
2011	Rice	4–8	3–5	4th (West)			
2012	Rice	7–6	4–4	T–3rd (West)	W Armed Forces		
2013	Rice	10–4	7–1	1st (West)	L Liberty		
2014	Rice	8–5	5–3	T–2nd (West)	W Hawaii		
2015	Rice	5–7	3–5	5th (West)			
2016	Rice	3–9	2–6	T–5th (West)			
2017	Rice	1–11	1–7	6th (West)			
Rice:		57–80	40–48				
Texas A&M–Commerce Lions (Lone Star Conference) (2019–2021)
2019	Texas A&M–Commerce	11–3	7–1	2nd	L NCAA Division II Quarterfinal	11	
2020–21	No team—COVID-19						
2021	Texas A&M–Commerce	7–4	5–2	2nd			
Texas A&M–Commerce Lions (Southland Conference) (2022)
2022	Texas A&M–Commerce	5–6	3–3	T–4th			
Texas A&M–Commerce:		23–13	15–6				
Total:		101–108					
National championship Conference title Conference division title or championship game berth
