= Milton Jowers =

American football and basketball coach and college athletics administrator

Biographical details
- Born: July 12, 1914; McMahan, Texas, U.S.
- Died: December 16, 1972 (aged 58); Houston, Texas, U.S.

Playing career

Football
- 1933–1934: Southwest Texas State

Basketball
- 1932–1935: Southwest Texas State

Coaching career (HC unless noted)

Football
- 1935: Teague HS (TX) (assistant)
- 1939–1941: San Marcos HS (TX)
- 1951–1953: Southwest Texas State
- 1961–1964: Southwest Texas State

Basketball
- 1935–1936: Teague HS (TX)
- 1936–1939: Shiner HS (TX)
- 1939–1941: San Marcos HS (TX)
- 1946–1961: Southwest Texas State

Administrative career (AD unless noted)
- 1961–1972: Southwest Texas State

Head coaching record
- Overall: 48–18–2 (college football); 287–106 (college basketball); 29–3–1 (high school football); 223–20 (high school basketball)

Accomplishments and honors

Championships
- Football; 1 LSC (1963)

Milton Warren Jowers (July 12, 1914 – December 16, 1972) was an American football and basketball coach and college athletics administrator. He served two stints as the head football coach at Southwest Texas State University—now known as Texas State University–from 1951 to 1953 and 1961 to 1964, compiling a record of 48–18–2. Jowers was also the head basketball coach at Southwest Texas State from 1946 to 1961, tallying a mark of 287–106. He was the athletic director at Southwest Texas State from 1961 until his death on December 16, 1972, in Houston, Texas.

== Head coaching record ==
=== College football ===
Year	Team	Overall	Conference	Standing	Bowl/playoffs
Southwest Texas State Bobcats (Lone Star Conference) (1951–1953)
1951	Southwest Texas State	6–3–1	2–2–1	T–2nd	
1952	Southwest Texas State	7–2	4–1	T–2nd	
1953	Southwest Texas State	5–4	3–2	3rd	
Southwest Texas State Bobcats (Lone Star Conference) (1961–1964)
1961	Southwest Texas State	4–5–1	2–4–1	6th	
1962	Southwest Texas State	8–2	6–1	2nd	
1963	Southwest Texas State	10–0	6–0	1st	
1964	Southwest Texas State	8–2	4–2	3rd	
Southwest Texas State:		48–18–2	27–12–2		
Total:		48–18–2			
National championship Conference title Conference division title or championship game berth
