= R. W. Parker =

American football and track coach (1912–1984)

Biographical details
- Born: June 15, 1912
- Died: June 7, 1984 (aged 71)

Playing career

Football
- c. 1930: North Texas Agricultural
- 1933–1935: Centenary
- Position: End

Coaching career (HC unless noted)

Football
- 1943–?: Laredo HS (TX)
- c. 1946: Stephen F. Austin HS (TX)
- –1953: Stephen F. Austin (assistant)
- 1954–1959: Southwest Texas State

Track and field
- ?: Stephen F. Austin

Head coaching record
- Overall: 31–24–3 (college football); 36–29 (basketball)

Accomplishments and honors

Championships
- Football; 2 LSC (1954–1955)

Robert W. "Crock" Parker Jr. (June 15, 1912 – June 7, 1984) was an American football and track and field coach. He served as the head football coach at Southwest Texas State College—now known as Texas State University–from 1954 to 1959, compiling a record of 30–17–3. Parker was also the head track coach and an assistant football coach at Stephen F. Austin State University in Nacogdoches, Texas.

Parker attended North Texas Agricultural College—now known as the University of Texas at Arlington–where he played football, basketball, and baseball. He was a teammate in all three sports with his brother, Buddy Parker, who went on to coach in the National Football League (NFL) and Jack Gray, who became the head basketball coach at the University of Texas at Austin.

== Head coaching record ==
=== Football ===
| Year | Team | Overall | Conference | Standing | Bowl/playoffs |
|---|---|---|---|---|---|
Southwest Texas State Bobcats (Lone Star Conference) (1954–1959)
| 1954 | Southwest Texas State | 6–3–1 | 5–0–1 | T–1st | |
| 1955 | Southwest Texas State | 6–1–2 | 5–1 | T–1st | |
| 1956 | Southwest Texas State | 6–3 | 4–2 | 3rd | |
| 1957 | Southwest Texas State | 4–6 | 3–4 | 5th | |
| 1958 | Southwest Texas State | 5–5 | 4–3 | T–4th | |
| 1959 | Southwest Texas State | 4–6 | 2–5 | 7th | |
| Southwest Texas State: | | 31–24–3 | 23–15–1 | | |
| Total: | | 31–24–3 | | | |
National championship Conference title Conference division title or championship game berth
