= NAAS Rodd Field =

NAAS Cuddihy Field
- Corpus Christi, Texas, United States
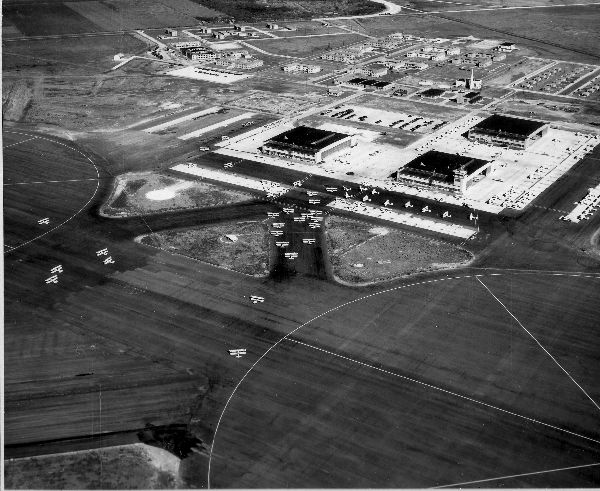
- Aerial view of NAAS Rodd Field in 1943.

Site information
- Type: Naval Auxiliary Air Station
- Controlled by: United States Navy
- Condition: Demolished

Location
- Location in Texas
- Coordinates: 27°38′52″N 97°22′46″W
- Area: 861 acres

Site history
- Built: 1941
- In use: 1941 - 1956
- Events: World War II

Airfield information
Runways
Direction	Length and surface
04/22	1,859 metres (6,099 ft) Asphalt
08/26	1,859 metres (6,099 ft) Asphalt
13/31	1,859 metres (6,099 ft) Asphalt
17/35	1,859 metres (6,099 ft) Asphalt
- Other airfield facilities: 3 steel hangars and paved apron

Naval Auxiliary Air Station Rodd Field or Rodd Field was a military airport in Corpus Christi, Texas. Owned and operated by the United States Navy, Cuddihy Field served as a satellite field to support flight training in Naval Air Station Corpus Christi.

== History ==
In 1940, the federal government acquired 861 acres for the construction of NAAS Rodd Field. The airfield was named after Lieutenant Herbert C. Rodd, who was a radio officer in the Curtiss NC-4 that completed first successful trans-Atlantic flight in May 1919. He died in the crash of a Vought O2U Corsair seaplane near Hampton Roads, Virginia on 15 June, 1932.

On 7 June, 1941, NAAS Rodd Field was commissioned by the U.S. Navy. It consisted of two asphalt landing mats, ramp, and two steel hangars. The control tower was built into the corner of one of the hangars. Rodd Field primarily trained Navy pilots with Naval Aircraft Factory N3N-3 biplane trainers. By 1942, the airfield was upgraded to have a configuration of 4 paved 6,100 foot long runways, taxiways, a larger ramp, and a third hangars. It also had a street grid totaling up to 75 buildings. It was assigned 9 outlying fields from the Kingsville Outlying Landing Fields, which included Outlying Field 1A, Outlying Field 1B, Outlying Field 1 C, Outlying Field 1D, Outlying Field No. 10, Outlying Field No. 11, Outlying Field No. 14, Outlying Field No, 25, and Rockport NOLF.

By the 1950s, Rodd Field became a Naval Auxiliary Landing Field (NALF). In 1954, two hangars were dismantled and relocated to Chase Field. In 1956, NALF Rodd Field was closed, and all 861 acres weee declared excess to the government's defense needs. Following several site surveys, NASA converted Rodd Field into a Mercury tracking station. The remaining hangar was converted into office space, and was equipped with a tracking antennae on the west side of the roof. The antennae was used for tracking low-earth orbit missions from Project Mercury & Project Gemini. In 1960, the General Services Administration (GSA) sold portions of the property to several private parties.

=== Texas MSFN tracking station ===
When the Apollo program emerged in the 1960s, a larger antennae was needed to communicate with the lunar-ranging vehicle. Following this, the GSA transferred 136 acres to NASA in 1964. By 1967, new facilities were built north of the hangar. In March 1967, the Texas Manned Space Flight Network Tracking Station was opened, and was operated by the Bendix Field Engineering Corporation. It was equipped with a 30 foot unified S Band dish. The last hangar was used as a main operations building, containing administrative offices. The hangar also housed telemetry systems, a command system, a UNIVAC 1218 computer, a comtech console, and ground communications equipment. Located south of the hangar was a VHF Acquisition Aid, and located north was the Unified S-Band Dish, and power generation equipment. The station served as a remote station, removing telemetry data, tracking information, and voice communications to MCCH Control Center in Houston. It also operated as an uplink facility between lunar vehicles & the MCCH. Following the launch of the Skylab 3 in June 1973, NASA ended operations at the tracking station.

=== Closure ===
Texas MSFN Tracking Station was closed by 1974, in which their property was transferred back to the GSA. In the 1970s, the Corpus Christi Army Depot utilized the hangar to store helicopter components awaiting repair & return to service. At the time, the hangar was in a derelict condition. By 1979, the runway pavement was demolished. Following an application, the city was awarded 126.97 acres in August 1979. On 22 August, 1979, an acceptance ceremony was held, attended by Corpus Christi Mayor Luther Jones, assistant regional director for recreation programs for the South Central Regional Office of the Heritage Conservation and Recreation Service Edwin Shellenberger, and chair of the Corpus Christi Parks and Recreation Advisory Board Mary Lou Huffman. In 1980, the GSA transferred the property to the City of Corpus Christi, leading to the establishment of Bill Witt Park under the Surplus Property for Parks program. An additional 9.25 acres which included a hangar was awarded on November of that year. In August 1982, a lighted four-field softball complex completed with a central concession stand, rest-room and press box. It was also equipped with bleachers, and an automatic irrational system. The project cost $554,982 with 50% of the money coming from the 1977 bond fund and the other 50% from the state's Local Parks, Recreational and Open Space Fund.

By 1987-88, the city acquired an additional 175 acres along the southern periphery of Rodd Field, becoming Oso Creek Park. By the 1990s, housing development encroached over the northwest portion of the former runways.

== Present ==
By 2001, most of the runways have been removed, except for a 800 foot long segment of a runway which was used as a parking lot for baseball fields. In 2008, the last hangar was removed, and only the north ramp and a portion of a runway remained. Tie-down pad eyes are still visible in the concrete of the north ramp. Rodd Field fell under the Formerly Used Defense Sites program, which led to the removal of underground storage tanks, while a hangar and skeet range under city ownership still requires action.

== Accidents & incidents ==
- On 21 January, 1947, an ex-USAAF aircraft designated as MSN 75-5163 was damaged in a landing accident at NAAS Rodd involving another Stearman Model 75 Navy aircraft. After military service, it was transferred to civilian use and was restored in c2000.
- On 17 April 1947, an ex-USAAF aircraft designated as MSN 75-5172 was damaged in an accident during taxying at NAAS Rodd. After military service, it was transferred to civilian use and was registered as N52143, owned by Delta Air Lines under the Dusting Division. The same aircraft would be involved in more accidents in 1974 and 1977, and was still active as of November 2020.

== See also ==
- Naval Outlying Landing Field Waldron
- Naval Air Station Corpus Christi
- NAAS Cuddihy Field
