= NAAS Cuddihy Field =

Previous military airport in the United States

NAAS Cuddihy Field
- Corpus Christi, Texas, United States
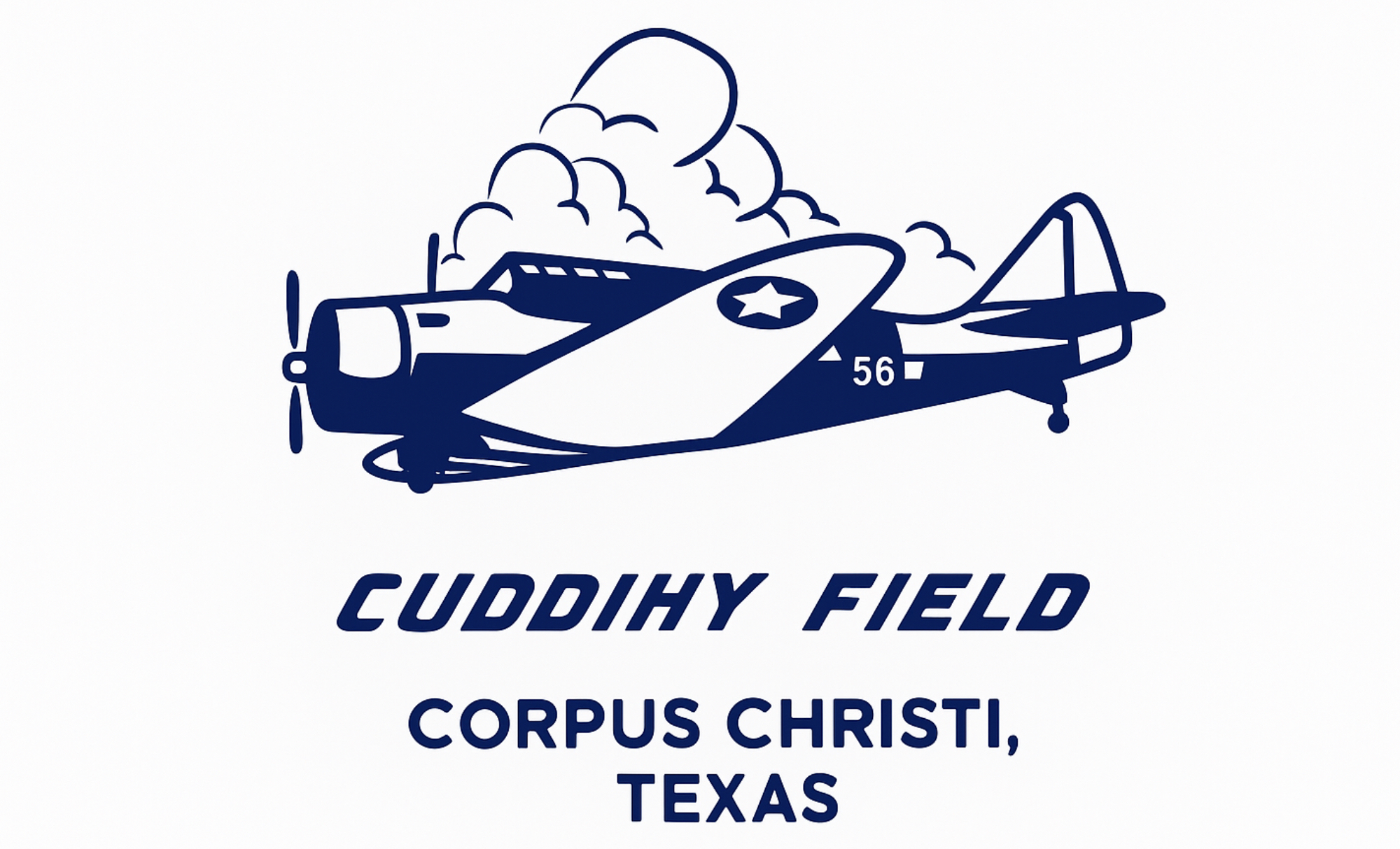

Site information
- Type: Naval Auxiliary Air Station
- Controlled by: United States Navy
- Condition: Demolished

Location
- Location in Texas
- Coordinates: 27°43′32″N 97°30′40″W
- Area: 803 acres

Site history
- Built: November 1940
- In use: 3 November 1941 - 31 January 1947
- Events: World War II

Airfield information
Runways
Direction	Length and surface
04/22	1,524 metres (5,000 ft) Asphalt
08/26	1,524 metres (5,000 ft) Asphalt
13/31	1,524 metres (5,000 ft) Asphalt
17/35	1,524 metres (5,000 ft) Asphalt
- Other airfield facilities: 3 steel hangars and paved apron

Naval Auxiliary Air Station Cuddihy or Cuddihy Field was a military airport in Corpus Christi, Texas. Owned and operated by the United States Navy, Cuddihy Field served as a satellite field to support flight training in Naval Air Station Corpus Christi. It operated from November 1940 to April 1947, primarily providing flight training for American Navy cadets.

== History ==
In November 1940, the Navy began construction of Naval Auxiliary Air Station Cuddihy Field, designated as p-3. It was the third auxiliary air station of NAS Corpus Christi. Architect Albert Kahn was tasked with designing the hangars for the airfield. By 9 May 1941, the runways had been cleared, with only 2 hangars and other ancillary buildings being completed. After seven months of construction, Cuddihy Field had completed construction, with 3 hangars, paved apron, and 4 paved runways. Additional facilities included a powerhouse, utilities building, cadet's swimming pool, and a control tower. Seven outlying fields from the Kingsville Naval Outlying Fields were assigned to NAAS Cuddihy Field. This included Outlying Field No. 30, Outlying Field No. 31, Outlying Field No. 32, Outlying Field No. 33, Outlying Field No. 33, Outlying Field No. 34, Outlying Field No. 35, and Outlying Field No. 36.

On 3 September 1941, the airfield was named after Lieutenant George T. Cuddihy. He became a Naval aviator in 1921, and held the world record for seaplane speed of 188 mph in 1924. In 1929, he was fatally killed while testing UK's Bristol Bulldog airplane. On 3 November 1941, Cuddihy Field officially opened. By March 1944, Cuddihy Field had 223 officers, 400 cadets, and 1040 enlisted men. By March 1945, 288 Navy aircraft were based at Cuddihy Field, mostly single-engine.

=== Post-war ===
When World War II ended on 2 September 1945, the airfield's role had diminished, and it was deactivated by the navy on 31 January 1947. Cuddihy Field was finally closed by the Navy on 8 April 1947, and it was leased to the city of Corpus Christi a week later, assuming operation of the former field. Afterwards, the city began subleasing out portions of the airfield. Cuddihy Field began operating as a civil airport. Following this, many private aircraft were relocated from Cliff Maus Airport to Cuddihy Field. From 1948 to 1949, the airfield was used as the temporary campus of the Arts & Technological College. By 1956, the runways were used for aircraft carrier practice. From 1961 to 1977, the runways were used as a dragstrip and racetrack. A meeting was held every March 2, with general admission costing $3.75. Gault Aviation began operating out of Cuddihy Field, hosting Piper PA-28 Cherokee sales, rentals, flight training, charter services, and an aerial ambulance service. By 1963, Cuddihy Field became a private airfield, with runways 4/22 and 07/26 closing. The operators were Coastal State Aviation Inc & Coastal States Aircraft Corp. By 1968, all four runways remained intact although deteriorated, with light single-engine aircraft still operating from the airfield. In 1970, Jimmy Adhair purchased a portion of Cuddihy with a 3rd place bid at a GSA auction. Tennessee Pipeline Co. began using Cuddihy Field shortly thereafter. Between 1967 and 1979, runways 04/22 and 08/26 were demolished. A smaller aircraft hangar was also built on the northwest side of runway 13, and Cuddihy Field now began operating a single asphalt runway numbered 13/31. The former runway 17/35 was narrower, serving as a taxiway between 13/31 and the apron.

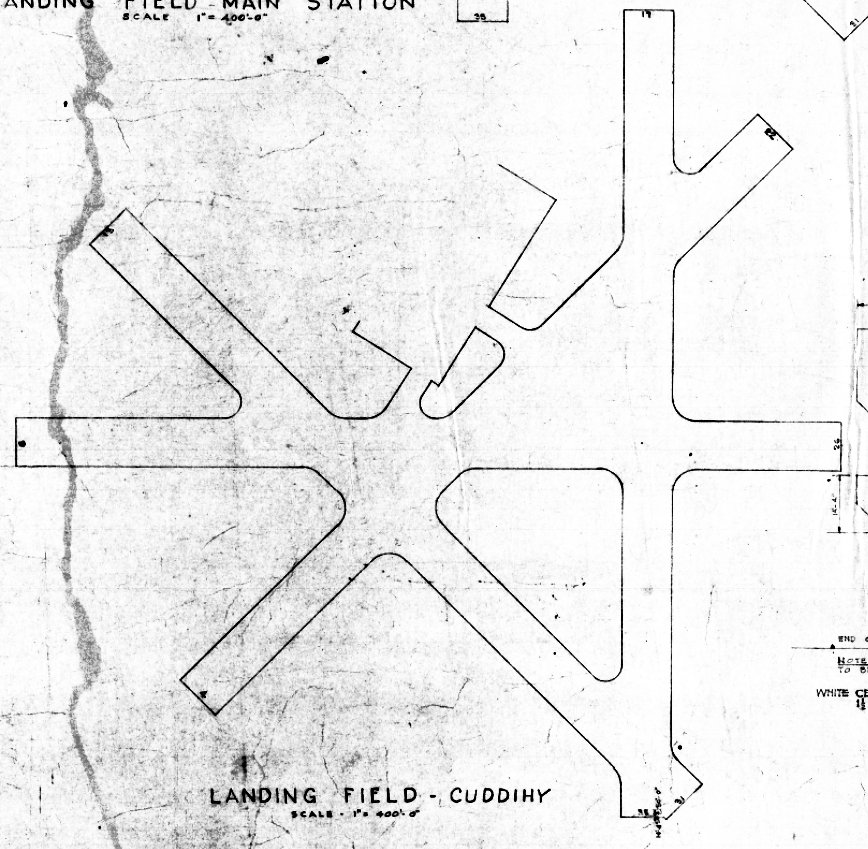
Blueprint of Cuddihy Landing Field, c1940s.

== Present ==
By 2006, the northern-most hangar's roof had caved in, which had previously been used as a radio shop. By 2008, Cuddihy Field Airport remained private, stilled owned by Jimmy Adhair with one multi-engine aircraft based at the airport. Between 2010 and 2012, all three hangars were demolished due to their deteriorating state.

Today, Cuddihy Field's ancillary buildings remain in a deteriorating condition. It is now known as Cuddihy Airport, privately owned with a runway remaining the same length since its original construction.

== See also ==
- NAAS Rodd Field
- Naval Outlying Landing Field Waldron
- Naval Air Station Corpus Christi
