= 1946 Southeastern Savages football team =

American college football season

1946 Southeastern Savages football

OCC champion
- Conference: Oklahoma Collegiate Conference
- Record: 9–3 (4–1 OCC)
- Head coach: Dave Stephens (3rd season)
- Home stadium: Paul Laird Field

1946 Oklahoma Collegiate Conference football standings
	Conf.					Overall
Team	W		L		T	W		L		T
Southeastern (OK) $	4	–	1	–	0	9	–	3	–	0
Central State (OK)	3	–	1	–	1	4	–	4	–	1
Southwestern Tech	2	–	2	–	1	5	–	3	–	1
East Central	2	–	3	–	0	5	–	5	–	1
Northeastern State	2	–	3	–	0	4	–	6	–	0
Northwestern State (OK)	1	–	4	–	0	3	–	5	–	0
$ – Conference champion

The 1946 Southeastern Savages football team was an American football team that represented Southeastern Oklahoma State College as a member of the Oklahoma Collegiate Conference (OCC) during the 1946 college football season. In their third, non-consecutive season under head coach Dave Stephens, the team compiled a 9–3 record, won the OCC championship, and outscored opponents by a total of 193 to 92.

In the first four games of the season, the Savages did not allow a single point scored by their opponents. They tallied nine touchdowns in those games but failed to convert a single point after touchdown.

Stephens had coached Southeastern for two seasons before World War II. He served in the Merchant Marine during the war. Upon his return to the program, he compiled a 50-player squad which he operated out of the modified T formation that he had run in 1941. Several players from Stephens' pre-war teams returned to the 1946 team.

Four Southeastern players were selected by the Associated Press as first-team players on the 1946 All-Oklahoma Collegiate Conference team: Gene Jones at end; James Harris at guard; Lloyd "Red" Skelton at center; and Howard Guyer at quarterback. In addition, end Bill Caldwell and fullback Lee Allen were named to the second team. Tackle Bert Lana and guard Charles Hollingsworth were named to the third team.

The team played its home games at Paul Laird Field in Durant, Oklahoma.

== Schedule ==
Date	Opponent	Site	Result	Source
September 20	Austin*	Paul Laird Field; Durant, OK	W 12–0	
September 27	Murray State (OK)*	Paul Laird Field; Durant, OK	W 18–0	
October 4	at Northeastern State	Tahlequah, OK	W 18–0	
October 11	Central State (OK)^{†}	Paul Laird Field; Durant, OK	W 6–0	
October 19	at Southwestern (TX)*	Georgetown, TX	L 6–19	
October 25	Northwestern Oklahoma State	Paul Laird Field; Durant, OK	W 19–7	
November 3	at Second Armored Division, Camp Hood*	Temple, TX	W 20–0	
November 8	at Southwestern Tech	Milam Stadium; Weatherford, OK	L 7–12	
November 14	Eastern Oklahoma A&M*	Paul Laird Field; Durant, OK	W 27–0	
November 17	at Brooke Field*	San Antonio, TX	L 6–34	
November 22	Bacone*	Paul Laird Field; Durant, OK	W 34–6	
November 28	at East Central	Ada, OK	W 20–14	
*Non-conference game; ^{†}Homecoming

== Roster ==
Starters

- Lee Allen, back, 190 pounds, Durant, Oklahoma
- Bill Caldwell, end, 195 pounds, Durant
- Mig Dinnard, guard, 180, Duncan
- Curtis Green, back, 170, Durant
- Howard Guyer, quarterback, 160, Durant
- James Harris, guard, 180 pounds, Duncan, Oklahoma
- Charles Hewitt, back
- Charles Hollingsworth, guard, 165 pounds, Duncan
- Gene Jones, end, 160 pounds, Durant
- Bert Lana, tackle, 190 pounds, Stilwell, Oklahoma
- Lloyd Skelton, center, 170 pounds, Fox, Oklahoma
- Ovid White, back, 165, Durant
- J.T. Williams, back, 176, Durant
- Aubrey Williamson, tackle, 195, Durant

Others

- Johnny Juett, back, 165, Durant
- Steve Hayes, center, 190, Wagoner
- Grady Tyndol, back, 165, Addington
- James Miller, guard, 190, Guthrie
- Tom Busby, end, 155, Caddo
- Bennett Freeny, back, 160, Caddo
- Paul Alley, guard, 190, Durant
- Don Ethridge, tackle, 225, Durant
- Jack Seabaugh, back, 165, Denison
- Charles Andrews, back, 175, Denison
- Marvin Harvey, tackle, 230, Orange, T.
- Sam Hunsaker, center, 170, Durant
- Jack Lucas, center, 185, Wetumka
- Bob Lemon, tackle, 240, Durant
- J. Van Meter, back, 160, Henryetta
- Don McDowell, end, 150, Henryetta
- H. Crowder, back, 195, Hartshorne
- B. Lovelace, end, 170, Hartshorne
- Nelson Turnbow, end, 182, Ryan
- Ben Earnest, end, 170, Phillips, T.
- Austin Earnest, end, 220, Oklahoma City
- Wayne Norwood, guard, 190, Idabel
- Elmer Butler, guard, 170, Ringling
- W.T. Thorne, back, 155, Sallisaw
- Gerald Sanders, back, 160, Tyler, T.
- Ray Drake, guard, 185, Muskogee
- M. Holland, back, 160, Peru, Ind.
- Jim Barnett, back, 155, Muskogee
- Jimmy Hallett, tackle, 190, Duncan
- Louis Whitley, back, 170, Duncan
- Harold Corbett, end, 165, Vinita
- Kelly Ryan, center, 167, Vinita
- Bill Belcher, guard, 175, Vinita
- Louis Green, end, 170, Vinita
- Lowell Dunegan, back, 180, Wilson
- B. Tucker, back, 155, Mineral Wells
- Earnest Kennedy, back, 165, Shawnee
- Dick Allen, end, 170, Lawton
- Earl Pruitt, back, 145, Lawton
- John Bass, back, 1800, Healdton
- Garland Landers, back, 190, Durant
- Bill Redman, back, 165, Eufaula
- Richard Wiley, back, 155, Fox
- Paul Lamour, tackle, 190, Haileyville
- B. McMurtrey, back, 160, Haileyville
- J.C. Dunn, end, 190, Spiro
- Eddy Enloe, back, 160, Zaneis
- W.L. Hawkins, back, 150, Madill
- Lennial Rambo, guard, 165, Durant
- Morris Haynie, tackle, 230, Durant
