= 1946 Oklahoma Collegiate Conference football season =

Oklahoma Collegiate Conference
- Sport: Football
- Teams: 6
- Champion: Southeastern

Football seasons
- 1945 1947

1946 Oklahoma Collegiate Conference football standings
	Conf.					Overall
Team	W		L		T	W		L		T
Southeastern (OK) $	4	–	1	–	0	9	–	3	–	0
Central State (OK)	3	–	1	–	1	4	–	4	–	1
Southwestern Tech	2	–	2	–	1	5	–	3	–	1
East Central	2	–	3	–	0	5	–	5	–	1
Northeastern State	2	–	3	–	0	4	–	6	–	0
Northwestern State (OK)	1	–	4	–	0	3	–	5	–	0
$ – Conference champion

The 1946 Oklahoma Collegiate Conference football season was the season of college football played by the six member schools of the Oklahoma Collegiate Conference (OCC) as part of the 1946 college football season.

The Southeastern Savages won the OCC championship with a 9–3 record (4–1 against conference opponents) and outscored opponents by a total of 193 to 92.

== Conference overview ==
Conf. rank	Team	Head coach	Conf. record	Overall record	Points scored	Points against
1	Southeastern (Durant)	Dave Stephens	4–1	9–3	200	92
2	Central State (Edmond)	Dale E. Hamilton	3–1–1	4–4–1	121	72
3	Southwestern Tech (Weatherford)	Jake Spann	2–2–1	5–3–1	146	80
4 (tie)	East Central (Ada)	Frank Crider	2–3	5–5–1	150	119
4 (tie)	Northeastern State (Tahlequah)	Doc Wadley	2–3	4–5	127	142
6	Northwestern State (Alva)	Joe Dollins	1–4	3–6	74	91

== Teams ==
=== Southeastern ===
1946 Southeastern Savages football

OCC champion
- Conference: Oklahoma Collegiate Conference
- Record: 9–3 (4–1 OCC)
- Head coach: Dave Stephens (3rd season)
- Home stadium: Paul Laird Field

The 1946 Southeastern Savages football team represented Southeastern Oklahoma State College of Durant, Oklahoma. In their third, non-consecutive season under head coach Dave Stephens, the team compiled a 9–3 record, won the OCC championship, and outscored opponents by a total of 193 to 92.

Date	Opponent	Site	Result	Source
September 20	Austin*	Paul Laird Field; Durant, OK	W 12–0	
September 27	Murray Aggies*	Paul Laird Field; Durant, OK	W 18–0	
October 4	at Northeastern State	Tahlequah, OK	W 18–0	
October 11	Central State (OK)^{†}	Paul Laird Field; Durant, OK	W 6–0	
October 19	at Southwestern (TX)*	Georgetown, TX	L 6–19	
October 25	Northwestern Oklahoma State	Paul Laird Field; Durant, OK	W 19–7	
November 3	at Second Armored Division, Camp Hood*	Temple, TX	W 20–0	
November 8	at Southwestern Tech	Milam Stadium; Weatherford, OK	L 7–12	
November 14	Eastern Oklahoma*	Paul Laird Field; Durant, OK	W 27–0	
November 17	at Brooke Field*	San Antonio, TX	L 6–34	
November 22	Bacone*	Paul Laird Field; Durant, OK	W 34–6	
November 28	at East Central	Ada, OK	W 20–14	
*Non-conference game; ^{†}Homecoming

=== Central State ===
1946 Central State Bronchos football
- Conference: Oklahoma Collegiate Conference
- Record: 4–4–1 (3–1–1 OCC)
- Head coach: Dale E. Hamilton (3rd season)
- Home stadium: Central College Field

The 1946 Central State Bronchos football team represented Central State University (now known as the University of Central Oklahoma) of Edmond, Oklahoma. In their third, non-consecutive season under head coach Dale E. Hamilton, the Bronchos compiled a 4–4–1 record (3–1–1 against OCC opponents), finished in second place in the OCC, and outscored opponents by a total of 121 to 72.

Date	Opponent	Site	Result	Attendance	Source
September 20	at Arkansas Tech	Russellville, AR	L 0–7		
October 5	Murray Aggies*	Central College Field; Edmond, OK	W 13–7	2,500	
October 11	at Southeastern	Paul Laird Field; Durant, OK	L 0–6		
October 18	at Southwestern (KS)	Southwestern College Field; Winfield, KS	L 0–13		
October 26	at Southwestern Tech	Milam Stadium; Weatherford, OK	T 20–20		
November 2	East Central^{†}	Central College Field; Edmond, OK	W 30–0	2,600	
November 9	at Corpus Christi Naval Air Station*	Corpus Christi, TX	L 12–13	2,000	
November 15	Northeastern State	Central College Field; Edmond, OK	W 19–6	< 1,000	
November 22	Northwestern State	Central College Field; Edmond, OK	W 27–0	2,000	
*Non-conference game; ^{†}Homecoming

=== Southwestern Tech ===
1946 Southwestern Tech Bulldogs football
- Conference: Oklahoma Collegiate Conference
- Record: 5–3–1 (2–2–1 OCC)
- Head coach: Jake Spann (4th season)
- Home stadium: Milam Stadium

The 1946 Southwestern Tech Bulldogs football team represented Southwestern Institute of Technology (now part of Southwestern Oklahoma State University) of Weatherford, Oklahoma. Led by fourth-year head coach Jake Spann, the team compiled a 5–3–1 record (2–2–1 against OCC opponents), finished in third place in the OCC, and outscored opponents by a total of 146 to 80.

Date	Opponent	Site	Result	Attendance	Source
September 14	at Abilene Christian*	Fair Park Stadium; Abilene, TX	L 0–28	3,000	
September 27	Western State (CO)*	Milam Stadium; Weatherford, OK	W 19–0		
October 4	East Central	Milam Stadium; Weatherford, OK	L 2–6		
October 11	Southwestern (KS)*	Milam Stadium; Weatherford, OK	W 33–0		
October 19	at Northwestern State	Alva, OK	W 7–0	3,000	
October 26	Central State	Milam Stadium; Weatherford, OK	T 20–20		
November 2	at Northeastern State	Tahlequah, OK	L 6–7		
November 8	Southeastern	Milam Stadium; Weatherford, OK	W 12–7		
November 16	at Eastern New Mexico	Portales, NM	W 47–12		
*Non-conference game

=== East Central ===
1946 East Central Tigers football
- Conference: Oklahoma Collegiate Conference
- Record: 5–5–1 (2–3 OCC)
- Head coach: Frank Crider (1st season)

The 1946 East Central Tigers football team represented East Central University of Ada, Oklahoma. In their first season under head coach Frank Crider, the Tigers compiled a 5–5–1 record (2–3 against OCC opponents), tied for fourth place in the OCC, and outscored opponents by a total of 150 to 119.

Date	Opponent	Site	Result	Attendance	Source
September 19	Murray Aggies*	Ada, OK	W 6–0		
September 27	Eastern Oklahoma	Ada, OK	W 39–6		
October 4	at Southwestern Tech	Milam Stadium; Weatherford, OK	W 6–2		
October 11	Ozarks*	Ada, OK	W 33–7		
October 18	at Cameron*	Lawton, OK	L 7–12		
October 25	Henderson State*	Ada, OK	L 12–19		
November 2	at Central State	Central College Field; Edmond, OK	L 0–30	2,600	
November 8	Northeastern State	Ada, OK	W 27–7		
November 15	at Northwestern State	Alva, OK	L 0–10		
November 22	at Austin*	Sherman, TX	T 6–6		
November 28	Southeastern	Ada, OK	L 14–20		
*Non-conference game

=== Northeastern State ===
1946 Northeastern State Redmen football
- Conference: Oklahoma Collegiate Conference
- Record: 4–5 (2–3 OCC)
- Head coach: D. M "Doc" Wadley (3rd season)

The 1946 Northeastern State Redmen football team represented Northeastern State University of Tahlequah, Oklahoma. Led by third-year head coach D. M. "Doc" Wadley, the Redmen compiled a 4–5 record (2–3 against OCC opponents), tied for fourth place in the OCC, and were outscored by a total of 142 to 127.

It was Northeastern's first football team since 1942. Elmer Ary and Carlos Clayton, both of whom played for Northeastern prior to the war, were selected as the team's co-captains.

Date	Opponent	Site	Result	Attendance	Source
September 27	Northeastern A&M		W 26–13		
October 4	Southeastern	Tahlequah, OK	L 0–18		
October 11	at Northwestern State	Alva, OK			
October 18	at Ozarks	Clarksville, AR	W 20–0		
October 25	at Southwest Missouri State	Springfield, MO	L 21–25		
November 2	Southwestern Tech	Tahlequah, OK	W 7–6	3,000	
November 8	at East Central	Ada, OK	L 7–27		
November 15	at Central State	Edmond, OK	L 6–19	< 1,000	

=== Northwestern State ===
1946 Northwestern State Rangers football
- Conference: Oklahoma Collegiate Conference
- Record: 3–6 (1–4 OCC)
- Head coach: Joe Dollins (1st season)

The 1946 Northwestern State Rangers football team represented Northwestern State College (now known as Northwestern Oklahoma State University) of Alva, Oklahoma. Led by first-year head coach Joe Dollins, the Rangers compiled a 3–4 record (1–4 against OCC opponents), finished in last place in the OCC, and were outscored by a total of 91 to 74.

Walter D. Newby was the athletic director, and C.L "Dick" Highfill was the assistant coach.

Date	Opponent	Site	Result	Attendance	Source
September 27	Panhandle A&M	Alva, OK	W 27–0		
October 11	Northeastern State	Alva, OK			
October 19	Southwestern Tech	Alva, OK	L 0–7		
October 25	at Southeastern (OK)	Paul Laird Field; Durant, OK	L 7–19		
November 1	at Southwestern (KS)*	Winfield, KS	L 6–13		
November 15	East Central	Alva, OK	W 10–0		
November 22	at Central State	Central College Field; Edmond, OK	W 27–0	2,000	
*Non-conference game

== All-conference team ==
The Associated Press (AP), based on votes of the OCC coaches, selected four Southeastern and four Central players as first-team picks on its 1946 all-conference team. The first-team choices were:

- Quarterback: Howard Guyer, Southeastern
- Backs: Bill Thompson, Southwestern; Johnny Dunaway, Central; Durard Givens, Central
- Ends: Gene Jones, Southeastern; Bennie Carlisle, Northeastern
- Tackles: Kenneth Brady, Central; Albert Stover, Southwestern
- Guards: Oscar Ragland, Central; James Harris, Southeastern
- Center: Lloyd "Red" Skelton, Southeastern
