= 1946 Sam Houston State Bearkats football team =

American college football season

1946 Sam Houston State Bearkats football
- Conference: Lone Star Conference
- Record: 6–2–1 (3–1–1 LSC)
- Head coach: Puny Wilson (6th season)
- Home stadium: Pritchett Field

1946 Lone Star Conference football standings
	Conf.					Overall
Team	W		L		T	W		L		T
North Texas State $	4	–	1	–	0	7	–	3	–	1
Sam Houston State	3	–	1	–	1	6	–	2	–	1
East Texas State	3	–	1	–	1	5	–	2	–	2
Southwest Texas State	3	–	2	–	0	6	–	2	–	2
Houston	1	–	4	–	0	4	–	6	–	0
Stephen F. Austin	0	–	5	–	0	1	–	9	–	0
$ – Conference champion

The 1946 Sam Houston State Bearkats football team was an American football team that represented Sam Houston State Teachers College (now known as Sam Houston State University) as a member of the Lone Star Conference (LSC) during the 1946 college football season. In their sixth non-consecutive season under head coach Puny Wilson and their first season since the end of World War II, the Bearkats compiled a 6–2–1 record (3–1–1 against LSC opponents), finished in second place in the conference, and outscored opponents by a total of 130 to 53.

The team played its home games at Pritchett Field in Huntsville, Texas.

== Schedule ==
Date	Opponent	Site	Result	Attendance	Source
September 21	at Louisiana College*	Alexandria, LA	W 12–0		
September 28	Texas A&I*	Pritchett Field; Huntville, TX	W 20–0	7,000	
October 5	at Corpus Christi NAS*	Buccaneer Stadium; Corpus Christi, TX	W 7–0	3,500	
October 12	Austin*	Pritchett Field; Huntsville, TX	L 18–19		
October 25	at North Texas State	Eagle Field; Denton, TX	W 12–0	6,500	
November 2	at East Texas State	Commerce, TX	T 0–0		
November 16	Southwest Texas State	Pritchett Field; Huntsville, TX (rivalry)	L 13–21		
November 23	Stephen F. Austin*	Pritchett Field; Huntsville, TX (rivalry)	W 20–7		
November 28	at Houston	Public School Stadium; Houston, TX	W 28–6	5,000	
*Non-conference game
