= 1946 Houston Cougars football team =

American college football season

1946 Houston Cougars football
- Conference: Lone Star Conference
- Record: 4–6 (1–4 LSC)
- Head coach: Jewell Wallace (1st season)
- Captains: Bill Cook; Tony Ditta
- Home stadium: Public School Stadium

1946 Lone Star Conference football standings
	Conf.					Overall
Team	W		L		T	W		L		T
North Texas State $	4	–	1	–	0	7	–	3	–	1
Sam Houston State	3	–	1	–	1	6	–	2	–	1
East Texas State	3	–	1	–	1	5	–	2	–	2
Southwest Texas State	3	–	2	–	0	6	–	2	–	2
Houston	1	–	4	–	0	4	–	6	–	0
Stephen F. Austin	0	–	5	–	0	1	–	9	–	0
$ – Conference champion

The 1946 Houston Cougars football team represented the University of Houston in the 1946 college football season as a member of the Lone Star Conference (LSC). The Cougars were led by head coach Jewell Wallace in his first season and finished with a record of four wins and six losses (4–6 overall, 1–4 in the LSC). Jewell started his career coaching at high school ranks. He coached at San Angelo, Greenville, El Paso Bowie, etc. in Texas.

== Schedule ==
Date	Opponent	Site	Result	Attendance	Source
September 21	Southwestern Louisiana*	Public School Stadium; Houston, TX	L 7–13	11,000	
September 27	at West Texas State*	Buffalo Stadium; Canyon, TX	W 14–12	4,000	
October 5	at Fort Hood*	Temple, TX	W 32–7		
October 12	Texas A&I*	Public School Stadium; Houston, TX	W 34–0	6,500	
October 19	at East Texas State	East Texas Stadium; Commerce, TX	L 14–20	6,000	
October 26	at Texas Mines*	Kidd Field; El Paso, TX	L 7–21	7,500	
November 9	Stephen F. Austin	Public School Stadium; Houston, TX	W 16–7	5,000	
November 16	North Texas State^{†}	Public School Stadium; Houston, TX	L 3–7	3,500	
November 22	at Southwest Texas State	Evans Field; San Marcos, TX	L 7–21		
November 28	Sam Houston State	Public School Stadium; Houston, TX	L 6–28	5,000	
*Non-conference game; ^{†}Homecoming
