= 1946 North Texas State Teachers Eagles football team =

American college football season

1946 North Texas State Teachers Eagles football

LSC champion

Optimist Bowl, W 14–13 vs. Pacific (CA)
- Conference: Lone Star Conference
- Record: 7–3–1 (4–1 LSC)
- Head coach: Odus Mitchell (1st season)
- Home stadium: Eagle Field

1946 Lone Star Conference football standings
	Conf.					Overall
Team	W		L		T	W		L		T
North Texas State $	4	–	1	–	0	7	–	3	–	1
Sam Houston State	3	–	1	–	1	6	–	2	–	1
East Texas State	3	–	1	–	1	5	–	2	–	2
Southwest Texas State	3	–	2	–	0	6	–	2	–	2
Houston	1	–	4	–	0	4	–	6	–	0
Stephen F. Austin	0	–	5	–	0	1	–	9	–	0
$ – Conference champion

The 1946 North Texas State Teachers Eagles football team was an American football team that represented the North Texas State Teachers College (now known as the University of North Texas) during the 1946 college football season as a member of the Lone Star Conference. In their first year under head coach Odus Mitchell, the team compiled a 7–3–1 record.

== Schedule ==
Date	Opponent	Site	Result	Attendance	Source
September 21	at Texas A&M*	Kyle Field; College Station, TX	L 0–47		
September 28	Austin*	Eagle Field; Denton, TX	W 14–0		
October 4	at Abilene Christian*	Fair Park Stadium; Abilene, TX	L 0–6		
October 12	at Brooke General Hospital*	San Antonio, TX	W 23–7		
October 19	at Stephen F. Austin	Nacogdoches, TX	W 9–0		
October 25	Sam Houston State	Eagle Field; Denton, TX	L 0–12	6,500	
November 2	at Southwest Texas State	Evans Field; San Marcos, TX	W 6–0		
November 8	at McMurry*	Fair Park Stadium; Abilene, TX	T 7–7		
November 16	at Houston	Public School Stadium; Houston, TX	W 7–3	3,500	
November 23	East Texas State^{†}	Eagle Field; Denton, TX	W 47–7	9,000	
December 21	vs. Pacific (CA)*	Public School Stadium; Houston, TX (Optimist Bowl)	W 14–13		
*Non-conference game; ^{†}Homecoming
