= Frank Crider =

American football player and coach (1907–1962)

Biographical details
- Born: March 18, 1907; Georgia, U.S.
- Died: February 6, 1962 (aged 54); Mendota, California, U.S.

Playing career
- 1927–1929: Oklahoma
- Position: Halfback

Coaching career (HC unless noted)
- 1945: Oklahoma (assistant)
- 1946–1950: East Central

Head coaching record
- Overall: 24–24–2

Accomplishments and honors

Awards
- First-team All-Big Six (1929)

Frank Wheadon Crider (March 18, 1907 – February 6, 1962) was an American college football player and coach. He was an all-conference halfback and team captain for the 1929 Oklahoma Sooners football team. He was an assistant coach for the Sooners in 1945. Crider served as the head football coach at East Central University in Ada, Oklahoma from 1946 to 1950.

== Head coaching record ==
Year	Team	Overall	Conference	Standing
East Central Tigers (Oklahoma Collegiate Conference) (1946–1950)
1946	East Central	5–5–1	2–3	T–4th
1947	East Central	4–5–1	0–4–1	T–5th
1948	East Central	6–4	3–2	3rd
1949	East Central	5–5	2–3	T–3rd
1950	East Central	4–5	2–3	T–4th
East Central:		24–24–2	9–15–1	
Total:		24–24–2		
