= 1946 Southwestern Louisiana Bulldogs football team =

American college football season

1946 Southwestern Louisiana Bulldogs football
- Conference: Louisiana Intercollegiate Conference
- Record: 6–4 (2–2 LIC)
- Head coach: Johnny Cain (6th season)
- Home stadium: McNaspy Stadium

1946 Louisiana Intercollegiate Conference football standings
	Conf.					Overall
Team	W		L		T	W		L		T
Southeastern Louisiana $	4	–	0	–	0	9	–	0	–	0
Louisiana Tech	3	–	1	–	0	7	–	3	–	0
Southwestern Louisiana	2	–	2	–	0	6	–	4	–	0
Northwestern State	1	–	3	–	0	4	–	6	–	0
Louisiana College	0	–	4	–	0	1	–	8	–	0
$ – Conference champion

The 1946 Southwestern Louisiana Bulldogs football team was an American football team that represented the Southwestern Louisiana Institute of Liberal and Technical Learning (now known as the University of Louisiana at Lafayette) in the Louisiana Intercollegiate Conference during the 1946 college football season. In their sixth year under head coach Johnny Cain, the team compiled a 6–4 record.

== Schedule ==
Date	Opponent	Site	Result	Attendance	Source
September 21	at Houston*	Public School Stadium; Houston, TX	W 13–7	11,000	
September 28	Stephen F. Austin*	McNaspy Stadium; Lafayette, LA	W 13–2		
October 4	at Southeastern Louisiana	Strawberry Stadium; Hammond, LA (rivalry)	L 13–27		
October 12	at No. 6 Alabama*	Denny Stadium; Tuscaloosa, AL	L 0–54	18,000	
October 18	at Mississippi Southern*	Faulkner Field; Hattiesburg, MS	L 0–6	8,000	
October 26	at Louisiana College	Bolton Stadium; Alexandria, LA	W 40–0		
November 2	Louisiana Tech	McNaspy Stadium; Lafayette, LA (rivalry)	L 6–34	9,000	
November 8	Troy State*	McNaspy Stadium; Lafayette, LA	W 64–0		
November 23	at Northwestern State	Demon Stadium; Natchitoches, LA	W 14–0	5,000	
November 29	Union (TN)*	McNaspy Stadium; Lafayette, LA	W 26–0	7,000	
*Non-conference game; Rankings from Coaches' Poll released prior to the game
