= 1946 Louisiana Tech Bulldogs football team =

American college football season

1946 Louisiana Tech Bulldogs football
- Conference: Louisiana Intercollegiate Conference
- Record: 7–3 (3–1 LIC)
- Head coach: Joe Aillet (6th season)
- Captain: Mike Reed
- Home stadium: Tech Stadium

1946 Louisiana Intercollegiate Conference football standings
	Conf.					Overall
Team	W		L		T	W		L		T
Southeastern Louisiana $	4	–	0	–	0	9	–	0	–	0
Louisiana Tech	3	–	1	–	0	7	–	3	–	0
Southwestern Louisiana	2	–	2	–	0	6	–	4	–	0
Northwestern State	1	–	3	–	0	4	–	6	–	0
Louisiana College	0	–	4	–	0	1	–	8	–	0
$ – Conference champion

The 1946 Louisiana Tech Bulldogs football team was an American football team that represented the Louisiana Polytechnic Institute (now known as Louisiana Tech University) as a member of the Louisiana Intercollegiate Conference during the 1946 college football season. In their sixth year under head coach Joe Aillet, the team compiled a 7–3 record.

Louisiana Tech was ranked at No. 78 in the final Litkenhous Difference by Score System rankings for 1946.

== Schedule ==
Date	Opponent	Site	Result	Attendance	Source
September 21	at Mississippi Southern*	Faulkner Field; Hattiesburg, MS (rivalry)	L 6–7	7,000	
September 28	at Howard Payne*	Lion Stadium; Brownwood, TX	W 13–7		
October 4	Louisiana College	Tech Stadium; Ruston, LA	W 33–6		
October 12	Arkansas State Teachers*	Tech Stadium; Ruston, LA	W 38–0		
October 19	at Ole Miss*	Hemingway Stadium; Oxford, MS	W 7–6		
October 26	vs. Northwestern State	State Fair Stadium; Shreveport, LA (rivalry)	W 14–7		
November 2	at Southwestern Louisiana	McNaspy Stadium; Lafayette, LA (rivalry)	W 34–6	9,000	
November 9	Southeastern Louisiana	Tech Stadium; Ruston, LA	L 14–22	4,000	
November 16	Oklahoma City*	Tech Stadium; Ruston, LA	L 2–6		
November 28	Southwestern (TX)*	Tech Stadium; Ruston, LA	W 34–20		
*Non-conference game
