= 1946 Southwest Texas State Bobcats football team =

American college football season

1946 Southwest Texas State Bobcats football
- Conference: Lone Star Conference
- Record: 6–2–2 (3–2 LSC)
- Head coach: George Vest (1st season)
- Home stadium: Evans Field

1946 Lone Star Conference football standings
	Conf.					Overall
Team	W		L		T	W		L		T
North Texas State $	4	–	1	–	0	7	–	3	–	1
Sam Houston State	3	–	1	–	1	6	–	2	–	1
East Texas State	3	–	1	–	1	5	–	2	–	2
Southwest Texas State	3	–	2	–	0	6	–	2	–	2
Houston	1	–	4	–	0	4	–	6	–	0
Stephen F. Austin	0	–	5	–	0	1	–	9	–	0
$ – Conference champion

The 1946 Southwest Texas State Bobcats football team was an American football team that represented Southwest Texas State Teachers College (now known as Texas State University) during the 1946 college football season as a member of the Lone Star Conference (LSC). In their first year under head coach George Vest, the team compiled an overall record of 6–2–2 with a mark of 3–2 in conference play.

Southwest Texas was ranked at No. 100 in the final Litkenhous Difference by Score System rankings for 1946.

== Schedule ==
Date	Opponent	Site	Result	Source
September 21	Randolph Field*	Evans Field; San Marcos, TX	W 47–0	
September 28	at 2nd Armored Division*	Woodson Field; Temple, TX	T 0–0	
October 4	at Texas A&I*	Kingsville, TX	W 28–0	
October 11	at Howard Payne*	Brownwood, TX	T 7–7	
October 19	Abilene Christian*	Evans Field; San Marcos, TX	W 18–0	
October 26	Stephen F. Austin	Evans Field; San Marcos, TX	W 13–7	
November 2	North Texas State	Evans Field; San Marcos, TX	L 0–6	
November 9	at East Texas State	Sulphur Springs, TX	L 0–12	
November 16	at Sam Houston State	Pritchett Field; Huntsville, TX (rivalry)	W 21–13	
November 22	Houston	Evans Field; San Marcos, TX	W 21–7	
*Non-conference game
