= Kingsville Naval Outlying Landing Fields =

Kingsville Outlying Landing Fields
- Corpus Christi, Texas in United States of America
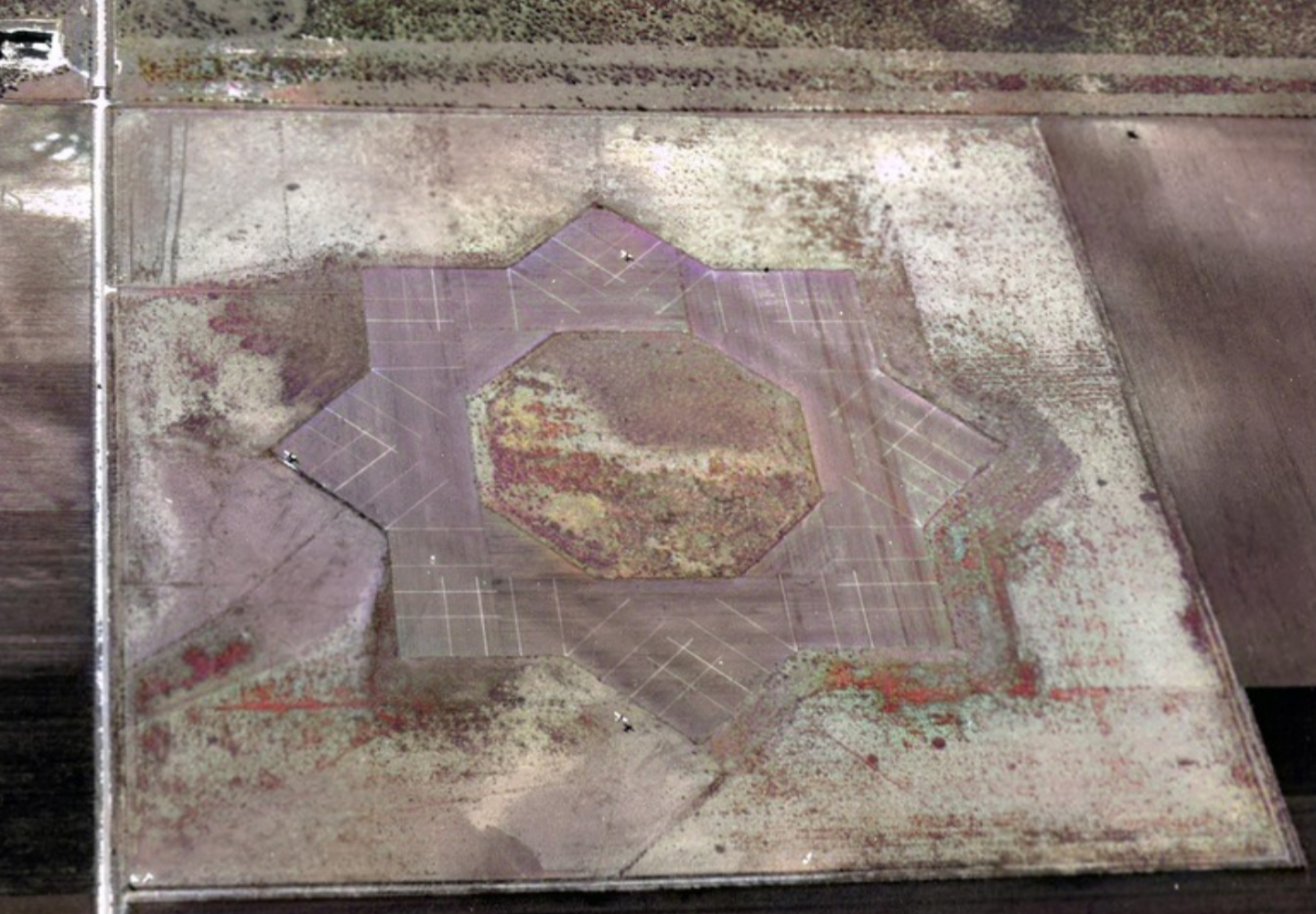
- Aerial view of Kingsville OLF #21 in 1944.

Site information
- Type: Military airfield complex
- Operator: United States Navy
- Condition: Demolished

Location
- Location within Texas Location within the United States
- Coordinates: 27°39′21″N 97°32′38″W

Site history
- Built: 1941
- Built for: Navy flight training
- In use: 1941 - 1949
- Events: World War II

The Kingsville Outlying Landing Fields in Corpus Christi, Texas are a complex of over 50 naval outlying landing fields built during World War II to support navy flight training. It was decommissioned in the 1950s when demand for Navy training had diminished post-war.

== History ==
During the onset of World War II, the Kingsville Outlying Landing Fields were built due to the need for naval aviators. It began construction in 1941, and aimed to facilitate naval flight training, primarily from NAS Kingsville, NAAS Rodd Field, NAAS Cuddihy Field, and NAAS Waldron Field. In order to facilitate the construction of the naval outlying landing fields (NOLF), thousands of acres owned by the King Ranch were acquired by the U.S. Government under several leases. On 1 April, 1941, the U.S. Government acquired 2,140 non-contiguous acres under lease number NOd-2005 from the King Ranch, allowing multiple NOLFs to be built. Each site would have encompassed 250 acres. These NOLFs primarily serviced emergency landings, refueling, bombing and gunnery operations. Each site was equipped with drainage, perimeter fencing, and sometimes a shelter house and observation hut.

=== Operations ===
The Kingsville Naval Outlying Landing Fields were primarily used for touch-and-go landings by naval pilots. Additionally, these fields would serve a dual function by acting as a target for radio-controlled rocket strafing and bombings. This would be guided by a bulls-eye target, lead-in target, and were typically equipped with observation huts.

At the end of World War II, the usage and demand of these NOLFs diminished. Lease NOd-2005 was terminated on 30 June, 1947, effectively deactivating every NOLF that was constructed under the lease. In the 1950s, the General Services Administration found that most fields were surplus to the needs of the government, and subsequently began selling and returning each of these properties. However, some remained as a navy bombing target. Today, there are no more fields left operational, with every site returned to cultivation for agriculture and cattle grazing.

=== Layout ===
Many of these airfields either used a circular landing mat measuring 450 meters in diameter, or a similar fan-shaped circular landing mat with 4 extended runways. Airfields also used 8 runways in a star-shaped format, which could accommodate landing and takeoffs from any wind directions. At-least 7 fields had used this method, and was also used in other airfields outside of the complex. Smaller fields did not have a paved landing pad, and rather used a rudimentary grass field. Sometimes, a Naval Outer Landing Field was constructed parallel to an existing field, essentially being referred to as a twin airfield. The NOLFs were originally designated by the Bureau of Aeronautics, and field numbers were assigned later onwards.

Seven of these outlying fields were assigned to NAAS Cuddihy Field. Eight of these outlying fields were assigned to NAAS Rodd Field.

== Naval Outlying Landing Fields ==
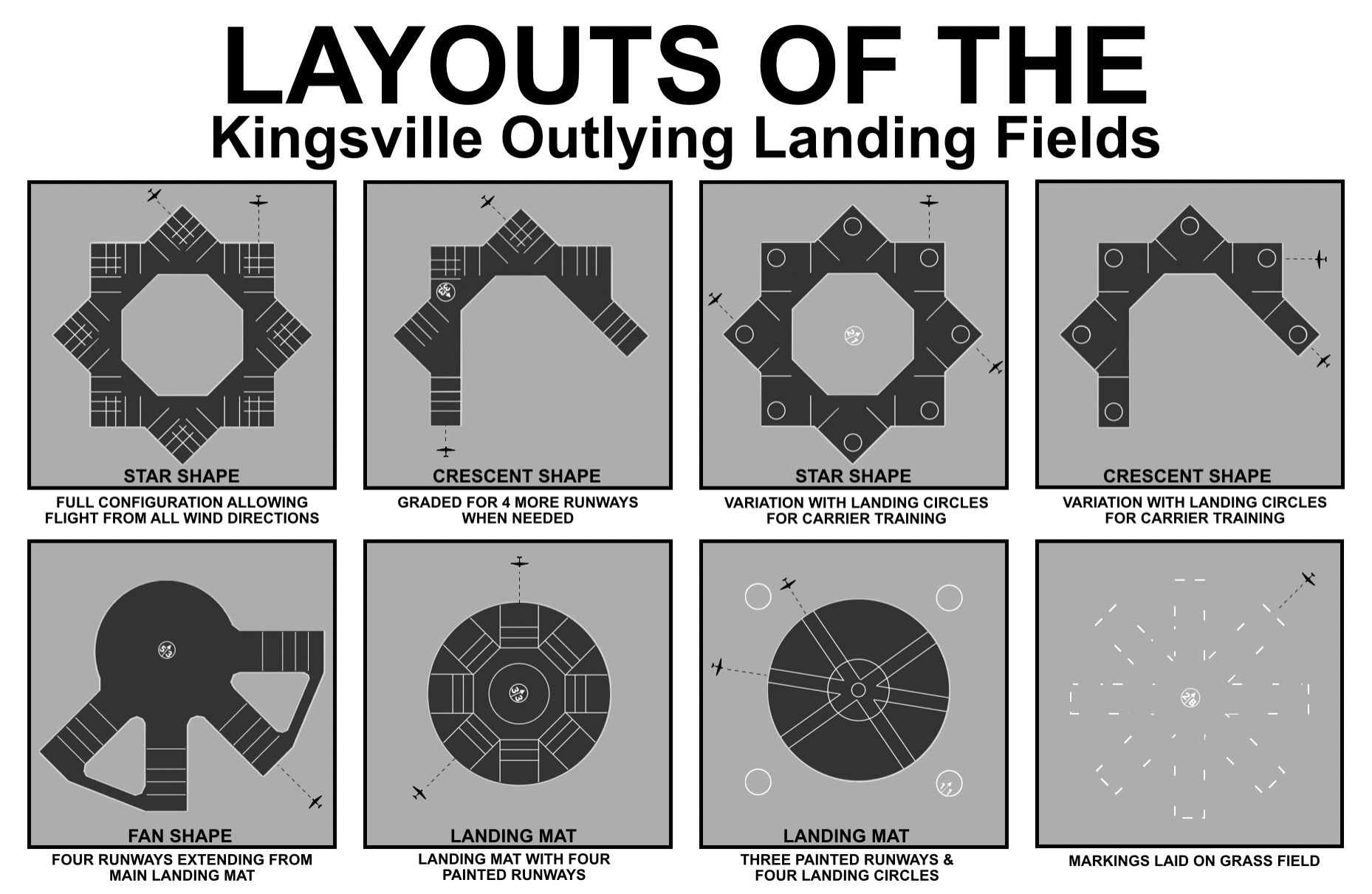
All configurations common in the Kingsville OLF Complex.

Naval Outlying Landing Fields
Field Name	Assignment	In Use	Layout	Coordinates	History
Field 1-A (NOLF #24311)	NAAS Rodd Field	13 November 1941 - 30 June 1946	Grass field	Location: 27°37′21″N 97°25′31″W	On 13 November 1941, the U.S. Government acquired 160 acres as part of leases NOd-2657 and NOd-2659 for the establishment of Field 1-A. The lease was terminated on 30 June, 1946. Since 1975, the property has been used for agricultural purposes.
Field 1-B (NOLF #22514)	NAAS Rodd Field	1 November 1941 - 30 June 1946	Grass field	Location: 27°36′15″N 97°28′42″W	On 1 November, 1942, the U.S. Government acquired 160 acres for the establishment of Field 1-B as part of lease NOd-2655. The lease ended on 30 June, 1946, and is currently cultivated for agricultural purposes.
Field 1-C (NOLF #21811)	NAAS Rodd Field	17 April 1942 - 30 June 1947	Grass field	Location: 27°34′20″N 97°23′12″W	On 17 April, 1942 the U.S. Government acquired 91 acres for the establishment of Field 1-C via lease NOd-2735 with the King Ranch. It was additionally equipped with a shelter house. After the lease ended on 30 June, 1947, the minor site improvements was handed over to King Ranch. Today, it is used as a pasture for grazing cattle.
Field 1-D (NOLF #22515)	NAAS Rodd Field	17 April 1942 - 30 June 1946	Grass field	Location: 27°31′51″N 97°25′27″W	On 17 April, 1942, the U.S. Government acquired 160 acres for the establishment of Field 1-D via lease NOd-2736 with the King Ranch. The Navy terminated the lease on 30 June, 1946, returning the land to the King Ranch. Today, it is used for cattle grazing.
Field 2-A (NOLF #25117)	NAAS Cabaniss	13 November 1941 - January 1947	Grass field	Location: 27°36′40″N 97°31′54″W	
Field 2-B (NOLF #25519)	NAAS Cabaniss	13 November 1941 - 30 June 1946	Grass field	Location: 27°37′06″N 97°34′19″W	
Field 2-C (NOLF #24823)	NAAS Cabaniss	3 April 1942 - 30 June 1946	Grass field	Location: 27°34′19″N 97°37′38″W	
Field 2-D (NOLF #25824)	NAAS Cabaniss	1 April 1942 - January 1947	Grass field	Location: 27°36′48″N 97°38′21″W	
Field No.1					
Field No.2					
Field No.3					
Field No.4					
Field No.5					
Field No.6					
Field No.7					
Field No.8					
Field No.9					
Field No.10 (NOLF #22912)	NAAS Rodd Field		Circular landing mat	Location: 27°34′55″N 97°24′56″W	
Field No.11 (NOLF #23416)	NAAS Rodd Field	1943 - 1945	4 Runways	Location: 27°33′49″N 97°28′24″W	
Field No.12 (NOLF #22521)		1943 - 1945	4 Runways	Location: 27°28′45″N 97°30′24″W	
Field No.13 (NOLF #23521)		1943 - 1949	4 Runways	Location: 27°31′28″N 97°32′38″W	One of 10 airfields leased from its original owners.
Field No.14 (NOLF #21917)	NAAS Rodd Field	1 April 1941 - 30 June 1946	Grass field	Location: 27°30′06″N 97°27′43″W	On 1 April, 1941, the U.S. Government acquired 2,140 non-contiguous acres under lease NOd-2005, of which only 250 acres were used to establish Field No. 14. On 30 June, 1946, the lease terminated, with ownership returned to King Ranch. Today, it is used by the ranch to raise cattle.
Field No.15 (NOLF #23425)				Location: 27°27′05″N 97°33′55″W	
Field No.16					
Field No.17					
Field No.18					
Field No.19					
Field No.20 (NOLF #25413)			Circular Landing Mat	Location: 27°38′29″N 97°28′35″W	
Field No.21 (NOLF #26117)		1943 - 1945	8 Runways	Location: 27°39′15″N 97°32′27″W	
Field No.22 (NOLF #26122)			Circular Landing Mat	Location: 27°38′38″N 97°36′56″W	
Field No.23					
Field No.24 (NOLF #25326)	NAAS Cabaniss Field	18 November 1941 - 30 June 1946	Grass field	Location: 27°34′58″N 97°40′25″W	On 18 November, 1944, the U.S. Government acquired 200 acres under lease NOd-2660 for the establishment of Field No. 24. On 30 June, 1946, the lease was terminated. Today, it is cultivated for agricultural purposes.
Field No.25 (NOLF #24024)	NAAS Rodd Field	1 April 1941 - 30 June 1947	4 Asphalt runways	Location: 27°30′49″N 97°37′26″W	On 1 April, 1941, the U.S. Government acquired 2,140 non-contiguous under lease NOd-2005, of which only 250 acres were used for the establishment of Field No. 25. On 30 June, 1947, the lease was terminated. Today, it is owned by the King Ranch and is a cultivated field where grain and cotton are grown.
Field No.26 (NOLF #25930)			Grass field	Location: 27°36′34″N 97°45′07″W	Also known as Bishop Naval Auxiliary Airfield, Field No. 26 was used for touch-and-go landings by pilots. Today, the site is used as city public airport, named Bishop Municipal Airport.
Field No.27					
Field No.28					
Field No.29					
Field No.30 (NOLF #27221)	NAAS Cuddihy Field			Location: 27°42′20″N 97°36′26″W	
Field No.31 (NOLF #28523)	NAAS Cuddihy Field	18 November 1941 - 3 December 1954	4 asphalt runways	Location: 27°46′19″N 97°37′28″W	On 18 November, 1941, the U.S. Government acquired a fee-simple title of 249.76 acres by declaration of taking for the establishment of Field No. 31. It consisted of a shelter house, 4 runways in a crescent shape, with graded land for the installation of 4 more runways if needed, totaling up to 36 acres of paved ground. On 3 December, 1954, the Government Services Administration return the 249.76 acres to the original land owners. Today, the site is owned by Treybig Farms Ltd. for agricultural purposes.
Field No.32 (NOLF #27325)	NAAS Cuddihy Field	18 November 1941 - March 1952		Location: 27°42′51″N 97°40′49″W	On 18 November, 1941, the U.S. Government acquired 250 acres of land via the declaration of taking, under civil action number 174 for the construction of Field No. 32. By March 1952, the Navy began leasing parts of the 250 acres in stages. On 30 August, 1957, 160 acres were sold to a citizen, while 30 acres were sold to its original owners on 13 September of that year. The remaining 60 acres were also eventually sold off by the Government Services Administration. Today, the site is cultivated for agriculture use.
Field No.33 (NOLF #28327)	NAAS Cuddihy Field	31 January 1941 - December 1954	4 runways	Location: 27°46′43″N 97°41′19″W	On 31 January, 1941, the Navy took possession of the site, and on 18 November, 1941, the U.S. Government acquired title to its 220 acres via declaration of taking. Field No. 33 was established, consisting of an approximately 173,500-square-yard caliche and asphalt landing mat in a crescent shape. In 1947, Nueces County began leasing Field No. 33. In fiscal year 1954, the Navy granted a lease of at least 155 acres to a private citizen, when the field was declared surplus by the Government Services Administration on December of that year. On 30 March, 1955, the U.S. Government transferred the surface rights to Nueces County for an airport. The mineral rights were sold to private citizens in April 1958, and the field was renamed to Nueces County Airport. The facility operated under that name until 1969, when the county began leasing the field to Fixed Based Operators. Today, Nueces County still retains ownership and operates Nueces County Airport.
Field No.34 (NOLF #26426)	NAAS Cuddihy Field			Location: 27°39′10″N 97°41′25″W	
Field No.35 (NOLF #28131)	NAAS Cuddihy Field	18 November 1941 - September 1949	4 runways	Location: 27°46′30″N 97°45′41″W	On 18 November, 1941, the U.S. Government leased 250 acres via declaration of taking for the construction of Field No. 35. On 23 August, 1943, it was reported to have a roughly-shaped crescent field with four runways composed of concrete, asphalt and caliche. Records indicate that Field No. 35 began leasing by the Navy. On 1 October, 1954, the Navy issued an agricultural lease NOy(R)-60822 to a private citizen.
Field No.36 (NOLF #26832)	NAAS Cuddihy Field	1943 - c1949	4 Asphalt runways	Location: 27°40′41″N 97°46′45″W	Also designated as Driscol Naval Auxiliary Airfield. It was used for touch-and-go landings by pilots. Today, it is reserved for state highway use.
Field No.37					
Field No.38					
Field No.39					
Field No.40 (NOLF #21305)		1941 - Present	Twin outlying fields, both with 4 Runways & Circular Landing Mat	Location: 27°37′59″N 97°18′34″W	The airfield was re-built in 1943 as NAAS Waldron Field.
Field No.41 (NOLF #20410)	NAS Kingsville	1942 - c1949	4 Runways & Circular Landing Mat	Location: 27°33′35″N 97°20′29″W	Intended to have a Naval Outer Landing Field parallel to the airfield, however it was never completed.
Field No.42 (NOLF #20115)	NAS Kingsville	1942 - c1950	4 Runways & Circular Landing Mat	Location: 27°29′40″N 97°21′32″W	
Field No.43					
Field No.44					
Field No.45					
Field No.46					
Field No.47					
Field No.48					
Field No.49					
Field No.50					
Field No.51 (NOLF #23940)		11 December 1942 - 22 November 1954		Location: 27°24′26″N 97°50′06″W	On 11 December, 1942, the U.S. Government acquired 246.7 acres for the establishment of Field No. 51. Following usage, the Government Services Administration sold 148.4 of the 246.7 acres to Gordon E. Trant. The remaining 98.3 acres was also put up to sale at that time. Today, it is cultivated for agricultural purposes.
Field No.52 (NOLF #29536)	NAS Kingsville/NAAS Rodd Field	10 June 1942 - 1947-52		Location: 27°24′12″N 97°44′19″W	On 10 June, 1942, the U.S. Government acquired 277 acres by Declaration of Taking filed under Civil Number 196. It was originally assigned NOLF #23536 on July 1943. The NOLF consisted of a bull-eyes target, strafing target, lead-in target, and observation huts. Field No. 52 was multi-purposely used for touch-and-go landings, and as a radio-controlled rocket strafing and bombing target. The Navy deactivated the NOLF between 1947 and 1952. On 2 December, 1957, the General Services Administration sold the 277 acres to a private buyer. Today, it is cultivated for agricultural purposes.
Field No.53 (NOLF #25938)				Location: 27°35′18″N 97°51′39″W	
Field No.54 (NOLF #23242)	NAS Kingsville	10 June 1942 - 3 December 1957	2 taxiways, 4 asphalt runways & circular landing mat	Location: 27°19′04″N 97°47′53″W	The U.S. Government acquired 200 acres of land for Field No. 54. After usage, it was sold to Gordon E. Trant on 3 December, 1957. Today, it is used for agricultural purposes.
Field No.55 (NOLF #22441)	NAS Kingsville	1943 - c1950	4 Runways & Circular Landing Mat	Location: 27°16′36″N 97°43′24″W	Assigned to NAS Kingsville and after the war, used as a navy bombing target.
Field No.56 (NOLF #24739)	NAS Kingsville	1 July 1942 - 28 August 1944	Grass Field	Location: 27°28′16″N 97°51′37″W	On 1 July, 1942, the U.S. Government acquired 97.2 acres via lease number NOy(R)-1657 from the Escondido Estates. However, an August 1944 survey depicts the total site being 95.85 acres. The property remained under Navy control until 28 August, 1944. Today, the property is owned by Kleberg County and used as a county park.

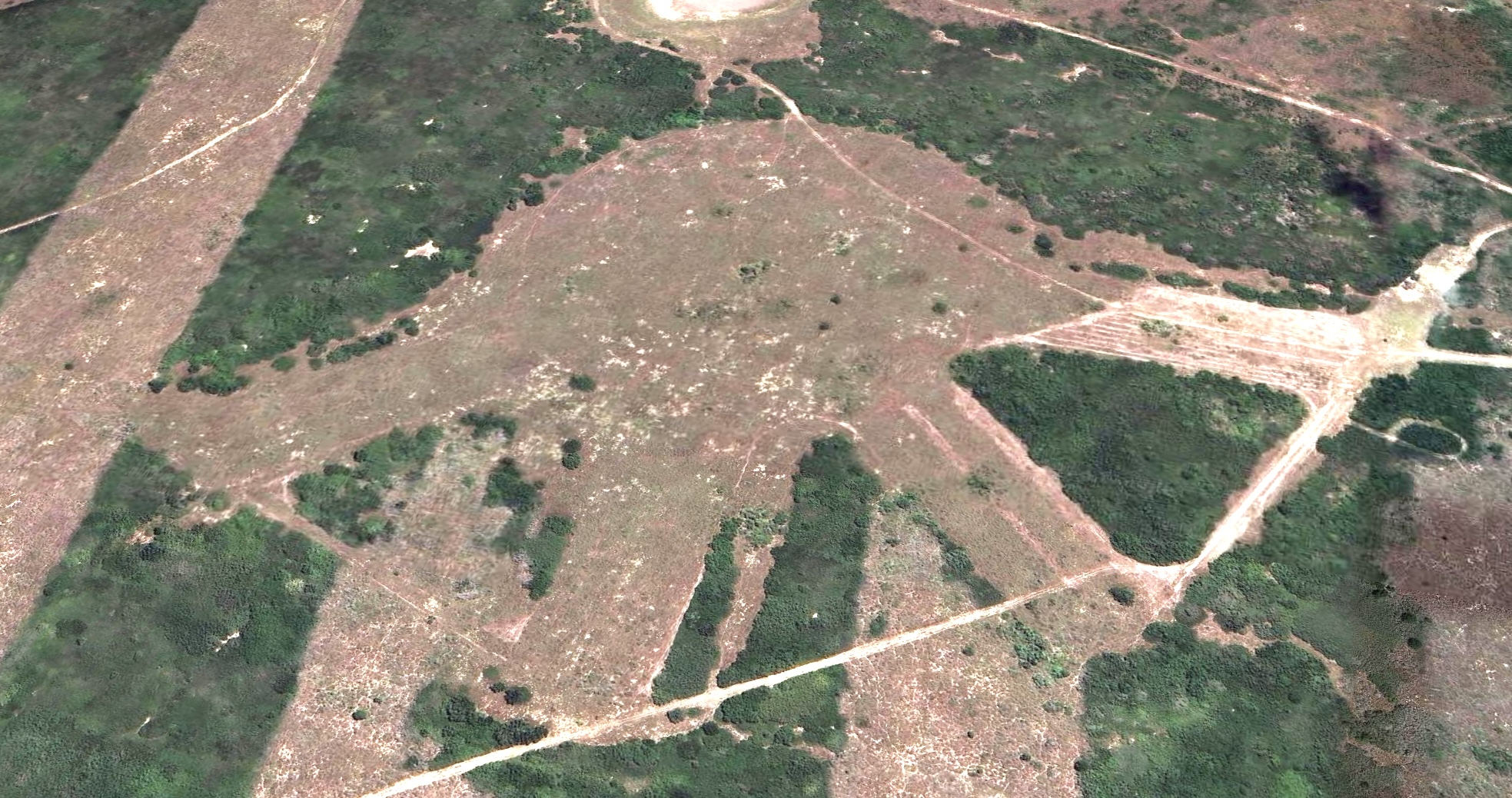
The shape of NOLF 41 is still recognisable from above.

== See also ==
- Naval Air Station Livermore Outlying Fields
