= 1946 Texas Conference football season =

- Sport: Football
- Teams: 5
- Co-champions: Abilene Christian, Southwestern (TX)

Football seasons
- 1945 1947

1946 Texas Conference football standings
	Conf.					Overall
Team	W		L		T	W		L		T
Abilene Christian +	3	–	0	–	1	8	–	1	–	1
Southwestern (TX) +	3	–	0	–	1	5	–	4	–	1
McMurry	2	–	2	–	0	4	–	4	–	1
Howard Payne	1	–	3	–	0	2	–	5	–	2
Austin	1	–	3	–	0	2	–	6	–	2
+ – Conference co-champions

The 1946 Texas Conference football season was the season of college football played by the member schools of the Texas Conference as part of the 1946 college football season. Abilene Christian and Southwestern (TX) tied for the conference championship. None of the Texas Conference teams was ranked in the Associated Press poll or played in a bowl game.

== Conference overview ==
Conf. rank	Team	Head coach	Conf. record	Overall record	Points scored	Points against
1	Abilene Christian	Tonto Coleman	3–0–1	8–1–1	228	53
1	Southwestern (TX)	Randolph M. Medley	3–0–1	5–4–1	243	181
3	McMurry	J. Vernon Hilliard	2–4	4–4–1	82	138
4	Howard Payne	Joe Bailey Cheaney	1–3	2–5–2	85	125
5	Austin	Garvice Steen	1–3	2–7–1	54	207

== Teams ==
=== Abilene Christian ===
1946 Abilene Christian Wildcats football

Texas Conference co-champion
- Conference: Texas Conference
- Record: 8–1–1 (3–0–1 Texas)
- Head coach: Tonto Coleman (2nd season)
- Offensive scheme: T formation
- Captains: Gladstone McClennan; Buster Dixon
- Home stadium: Fair Park Stadium

The 1946 Abilene Christian Wildcats football team represented Abilene Christian College now known as Abilene Christian University) as a member of the Texas Conference during the 1946 college football season. In their second non-consecutive year under head coach Tonto Coleman, and their first year after the end of World War II, the Wildcats compiled an 8–1–1 record (3–0–1 against conference opponents), outscored all opponents by a total of 228 to 53, and tied with Southwestern for the Texas Conference championship.

Date	Opponent	Site	Result	Attendance	Source
September 14	Southwestern Tech	Fair Park Stadium; Abilene, TX	W 28–0	3,000	
September 21	at East Texas State	Commerce, TX	W 26–7	4,000	
September 28	at Sul Ross	Alpine, TX	W 32–7		
October 4	North Texas State	Fair Park Stadium; Abilene, TX	W 6–0		
October 12	Southwestern (TX)	Fair Park Stadium; Abilene, TX	T 12–12		
October 19	at Southwest Texas State	Evans Field; San Marcos, TX	L 0–18		
October 26	McMurry	Fair Park Stadium; Abilene, TX	W 27–0		
November 9	Howard Payne^{†}	Fair Park Stadium; Abilene, TX	W 19–0	4,000	
November 16	at Austin	Sherman, TX	W 46–2		
November 23	at Texas A&I	Kingsville, TX	W 32–7		
^{†}Homecoming

=== Southwestern ===
1946 Southwestern Pirates football

Texas Conference co-champion
- Conference: Texas Conference
- Record: 5–4–1 (3–0–1 Texas)
- Head coach: Randolph M. Medley (8th season)
- Home stadium: Snyder Field

The 1946 Southwestern Pirates football team represented Southwestern College as a member of the Texas Conference during the 1946 college football season. In their eighth year under head coach Randolph M. Medley, Southwestern compiled an 5–4–1 record (3–0–1 against conference opponents), outscored all opponents by a total of 243 to 181, and tied with Abilene Christian for the Texas Conference championship.

Date	Opponent	Site	Result	Attendance	Source
September 21	at Baylor*	Municipal Stadium; Waco, TX	L 7–21	10,000	
September 28	at Oklahoma City*	Taft Stadium; Oklahoma City, OK	L 0–53		
October 5	at Rice*	Rice Field; Houston, TX	L 0–48	16,000	
October 12	at Abilene Christian	Fair Park Stadium; Abilene, TX	T 12–12		
October 19	Southeastern Oklahoma State*	Snyder Field; Georgetown, TX	W 19–6		
October 25	Howard Payne	Snyder Field; Georgetown, TX	W 33–7		
November 2	vs. Randolph Field*	San Antonio, TX	W 77–0		
November 8	Austin	Snyder Field; Georgetown, TX	W 34–0		
November 23	vs. McMurry	Abilene, TX	W 41–0		
November 28	at Louisiana Tech*	Tech Stadium; Ruston, LA	L 20–34		
*Non-conference game

=== McMurry ===
1946 McMurry Indians football
- Conference: Texas Conference
- Record: 4–4–1 (2–4 Texas)
- Head coach: J. Vernon Hilliard
- Offensive scheme: T formation

The 1946 McMurry Indians football team represented McMurry University as a member of the Texas Conference during the 1946 college football season. Led by head coach J. Vernon Hilliard, McMurray compiled a 4–4–1 record (2–4 against conference opponents), was outscored by a total of 138 to 82, and finished third in the Texas Conference.

Date	Opponent	Site	Result	Attendance	Source
September 21	Hardin–Simmons	Fair Park Stadium; Abilene, TX	L 0–31	6,500	
September 28	Eastern New Mexico	Abilene, TX	W 43–7		
October 5	vs. Sul Ross	Sweetwater, TX	W 6–2		
October 19	at Texas A&I	Kingsville, TX	W 13–10		
October 26	at Abilene Christian	Fair Park Stadium; Abilene, TX	L 0–27		
November 2	Austin	Abilene, TX	L 0–7		
November 8	North Texas State	Fair Park Stadium; Abilene, TX	T 7–7		
November 16	at Howard Payne	Brownwood, TX	W 13–6		
November 23	Southwestern (TX)	Abilene, TX	L 0–41		

=== Howard Payne ===
1946 Howard Payne Yellow Jackets football
- Conference: Texas Conference
- Record: 2–5–2 (1–3 Texas)
- Head coach: Joe Bailey Cheaney (8th season)

The 1946 Howard Payne Yellow Jackets football team represented Howard Payne University as a member of the Texas Conference during the 1946 college football season. Led by head coach Joe Bailey Cheaney, Howard Payne compiled a 2–5–2 record (1–3 against conference opponents), was outscored by a total of 125 to 85, and finished fourth in the Texas Conference.

Date	Opponent	Site	Result	Attendance	Source
September 21	Texas A&I	Brownwood, TX	W 27–0	9,000	
September 28	Louisiana Tech	Lion Stadium; Brownwood, TX	L 7–13		
October 5	East Texas State	Commerce, TX	T 7–7	3,500	
October 11	Southwest Texas State	Brownwood, TX	T 7–7		
October 18	Austin	Brownwood, TX	W 24–0		
October 25	at Southwestern (TX)	Georgetown, TX	L 7–33		
November 9	at Abilene Christian	Fair Park Stadium; Abilene, TX	L 0–19		
November 16	McMurry	Brownwood, TX	L 6–13		
November 22	at Hardin–Simmons	Fair Park Stadium; Abilene, TX	L 0–33	4,000	

=== Austin ===
1946 Austin Kangaroos football
- Conference: Texas Conference
- Record: 2–7–1 (1–3 Texas)
- Head coach: Garvice Steen

The 1946 Austin Kangaroos football team represented Austin College as a member of the Texas Conference during the 1946 college football season. Led by head coach Garvice Steen, Austin compiled a 2–7–1 record (1–3 against conference opponents), was outscored by a total of 207 to 54, and finished last in the Texas Conference.

Date	Opponent	Site	Result	Source
September 20	at Southeastern Oklahoma State*	Durant, OK	L 0–12	
September 28	at North Texas State*	Eagle Field; Denton, TX	L 0–14	
October 3	Stephen F. Austin*	Sherman, TX	L 7–20	
October 12	at Sam Houston State*	Pritchett Field; Huntville, TX	W 19–18	
October 18	at Howard Payne	Brownwood, TX	L 0–24	
October 25	East Texas State*	Sherman, TX	L 13–33	
November 2	at McMurry	Abilene, TX	W 7–0	
November 8	at Southwestern (TX)	Snyder Field; Georgetown, TX	L 0–34	
November 16	Abilene Christian	Sherman, TX	L 2–46	
November 22	East Central*	Sherman, TX	T 6–6	
*Non-conference game

== All-Texas Conference football team ==
The 1946 All-Texas Conference football team was selected by the conference coaches and announced on December 6, 1946. Abilene Christian and Southwestern each placed five players on the first team. The first-team selections were:

- Ends:

- Ted Barc, Southwestern
- Neal Bradshaw, McMurry

- Tackles:

- Willard Paine, Abilene Christian
- Dan Davenport, Southwestern

- Guards:

- Charles Floyd, Abilene Christian
- Max Jones, Southwestern

- Center:

- Dick Stovall, Abilene Christian

- Backs:

- Lawrence Dixon, Abilene Christian
- Joe Evans, Southwestern
- V. T. Smith, Abilene Christian
- Floren Hooefer (tie), McMurry
- Frank Means (tie), Southwestern
