= Corpus Christi Army Depot =

Coordinates: 27.6976°N 97.2779°W

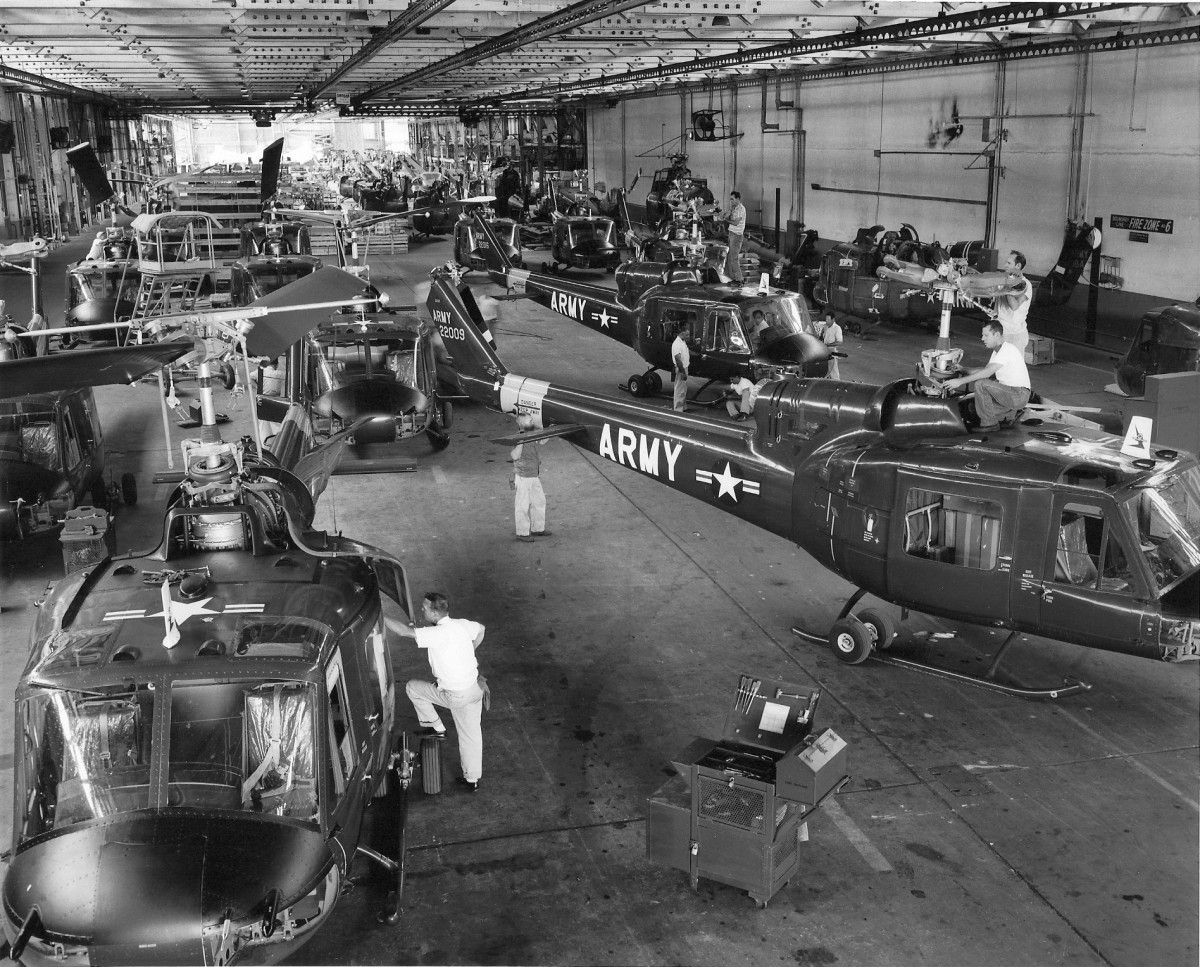
US Army Bell UH-1 Iroquois helicopters under repair at the Corpus Christi Army Depot during the Vietnam War

Corpus Christi Army Depot (CCAD) is a United States Department of Defense (DoD) Center of Industrial and Technical Excellence (CITE) for rotary wing aircraft. It has been a tenant of Naval Air Station Corpus Christi since 1961.

The CCAD mission is to ensure aviation readiness for all service and international sales programs. In 2018 Gail Atkins became the first woman to lead CCAD. Current commander of the CCAD is Col. Kevin J. Consedine.

== History ==
On 1 March 1961, Nancy K. Stratton, Caroline F. Beach, Emma M. Holley, Dorothy Sheehan, Joe Z. Hale, and Eloita C. Perry came together for administrative work and to process job application for the CCAD. On 10 March the CCAD was established as the U.S. Army Transportation Aeronautical Depot Maintenance Center (ARADMAC). In just one year the workforce was made up of 1,249 civilians and 14 military who in just that short time overhauled 28 Army aircraft and 153 engines. The CCAD motto is "We answer the nation's call, we keep the Army flying!"

In 1962 the first Bell Helicopter UH-1 (Huey) was overhauled and by 1968 the facility was in full operation repairing and overhauling almost 400 helicopters each year.

On 3 August 1970, Hurricane Celia caused damages to the depot which the staff cleaned up and brought back to operational order by 11 August.

On 28 June 1974, the ARADMAC was renamed to Corpus Christi Army Depot by unveiling the name mounted on the entrance of Hangar 8.

In the 1980s the CCAD added Chinook CH-47, AH-64 Apache, and Black Hawk helicopters and became the largest single employer in South Texas.

An Apprenticeship Program with the Del Mar College was established in 2000. The CCAD also has partnerships with the Texas A&M University–Corpus Christi and the Texas A&M University–Kingsville.
