= Naval Outlying Landing Field Waldron =

NOLF Waldron Field
- Corpus Christi, Texas, United States

Site information
- Type: Naval Outlying Landing Field
- Controlled by: United States Navy
- Condition: Operational

Location
- Location in Texas
- Coordinates: 27.671°N 97.395°W

Site history
- Built: 1941–1942
- In use: 1943–1964, 1969–present
- Events: World War II

Airfield information
- Identifiers: FAA LID: NWL
Runways
Direction	Length and surface
18/36	1,469 metres (4,820 ft) Asphalt
13/31	1,330 metres (4,364 ft) Asphalt

Naval Outlying Landing Field Waldron or Waldron Field (FAA: NWL) is a military airport in Corpus Christi, Texas. Owned and operated by the United States Navy, Waldron Field served as satellite field to support flight training in Naval Air Station Corpus Christi.

== History ==
NOLF Waldron was built around 1941–1942 by the United States Navy as a set of pair airfields, Naval Outer Landing Field 21305 and NOLF #40. Both airfields had 4 paved runways extending towards the west, northwest, north, and northeast, from a circular landing mat. It was a part of the larger Kingsville Naval Outlying Fields to support training from Naval Air Station Corpus Christi.

In March 1943, the Navy replaced the twin airfields with a much larger airport, consisting off 4 paved runways, 2 large hangars, and over 100 aircraft. On March 5, 1943, the airfield was named after John C. Waldron, who was killed in action while leading Torpedo Squadron 8 through the Battle of Midway. Finally by July 2, the airfield was activated, and served as a U.S. Naval Auxiliary Air Station. NAAS Waldron Field was assigned to 4 outlying fields; 21917 Outlying Field #12, 23521 Outlying Field #13, 23425 Outlying Field #15, and 20410 Outlying Field #41.

=== Post-war Usage ===
In early 1963, Waldron Field was used for TS-2A Field Carrier Landing Practice, however, there was no assigned squadrons. Between 1964 and 1967, the southern hangar and many smaller southeastern buildings were removed. Around 1964, NAAS Waldron was closed, and was labeled as Aband Airport. However, in July 1969, the airfield was reactivated as Outlying Landing Field Waldron, being assigned to NAS Corpus Christi.

=== 1995 - Present Day ===
In 1995, a United States Geological Survey photo depicted that 2 of Waldron's runways were decommissioned, while 2 others were still in use. In the 2000s, the Navy's T-34 Mentors used the airfield for touch and go landings. Following the Military Compatibility Area Overlay Districts (MCAOD) in 2011, airspace and land around NOLF Waldron was divided into three subzones, the Noise Subzone, the Vertical Obstruction Subzone, and the Lighting Subzone. Residential areas located in the Subzone were fitted with sound insulation, shielding for light fixtures, and the regulation of potential obstructions including natural terrain and man-made structures. Around 2014, a new control tower and fire department building was constructed.

Currently, since April 2021, the Sports Car Club of America rents NOLF Waldron once a month for car racing. The US Navy’s T-6 Texans primarily use the airfield. They operate on runway 13, and execute overhead breaks for a left-hand pattern.
