= Naval Air Station Corpus Christi =

Naval air base in Texas, United States

- Truax Field
- Corpus Christi, Texas in the United States
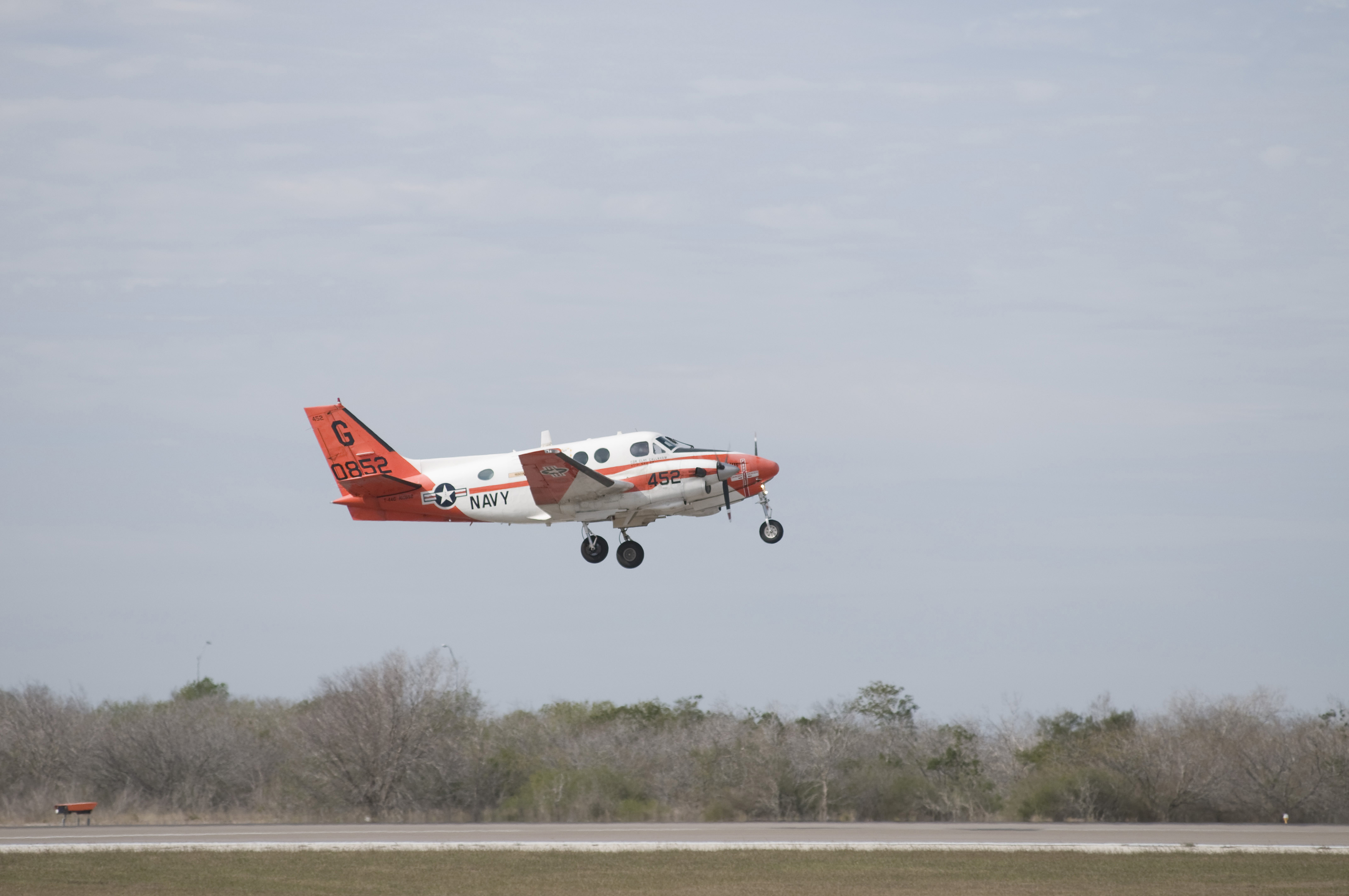
- A T-44C Pegasus of Training Wing Four based at NAS Corpus Christi

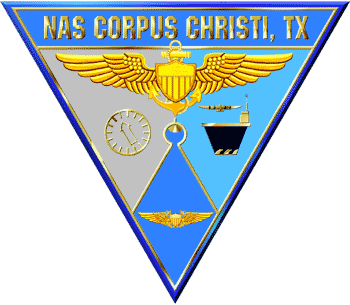

Site information
- Type: Naval Air Station
- Owner: United States Department of Defense
- Operator: US Navy
- Controlled by: Navy Region Southeast
- Condition: Operational
- Website: Official website

Location
- Location in the United States
- Coordinates: 27°41′33″N 97°17′28″W

Site history
- Built: 1941
- In use: 1941 – present

Garrison information
- Current commander: Captain Ty C. Jurica
- Garrison: Training Air Wing Four

Airfield information
- Identifiers: IATA: NGP, ICAO: KNGP, FAA LID: NGP, WMO: 722515
- Elevation: 2.7 metres (8 ft 10 in) AMSL
Runways
| Direction | Length and surface |
|---|---|
| 13R/31L | 2,439 metres (8,002 ft) Porous European Mix |
| 18/36 | 1,525 metres (5,003 ft) Asphalt |
| 04/22 | 1,524 metres (5,000 ft) Asphalt |
| 13L/31R | 1,524 metres (5,000 ft) Asphalt |

Naval Air Station Corpus Christi is a United States Navy naval air station located in Corpus Christi, Texas. The primary mission of NAS Corpus Christi is to support naval aviation through flight training for U.S. Navy and Marine Corps aviators, as well as through tenant commands and related facilities.

== History ==
A naval air station for Corpus Christi had been proposed since the mid-1930s, and the city's congressman, Richard M. Kleberg, supported it. But it remained a low priority construction project for the U.S. Navy as late as January 9, 1940. (The Kleberg family and Roy Miller both supported Vice President John Nance Garner's quest for the 1940 presidential nomination.) Rep. Lyndon B. Johnson made himself a key Texas ally of President Franklin D. Roosevelt's bid for a third term, and the White House told the Navy Department to consult Johnson, and heed his advice, on Navy contracts in Texas. By February 1940, the project was on the Navy's preferred list. Brown & Root, a Houston firm, shared the construction contract with another New Deal supporter, Henry Kaiser; the president personally signed the (first) cost plus fixed fee contract June 13, 1940. The Roosevelt campaign in Texas no longer had a shortage of cash.

The official step leading to the construction of the Naval Air Station was initiated by the 75th United States Congress in 1938. A board found that a lack of training facilities capable of meeting an emergency demand for pilots constituted a grave situation. They recommended the establishment of a second air training station, and further, that it be located on Corpus Christi Bay. NAS Corpus Christi was commissioned by its first Commanding Officer, CAPT Alva Bernhard, on March 12, 1941. The first flight training started on May 5, 1941.

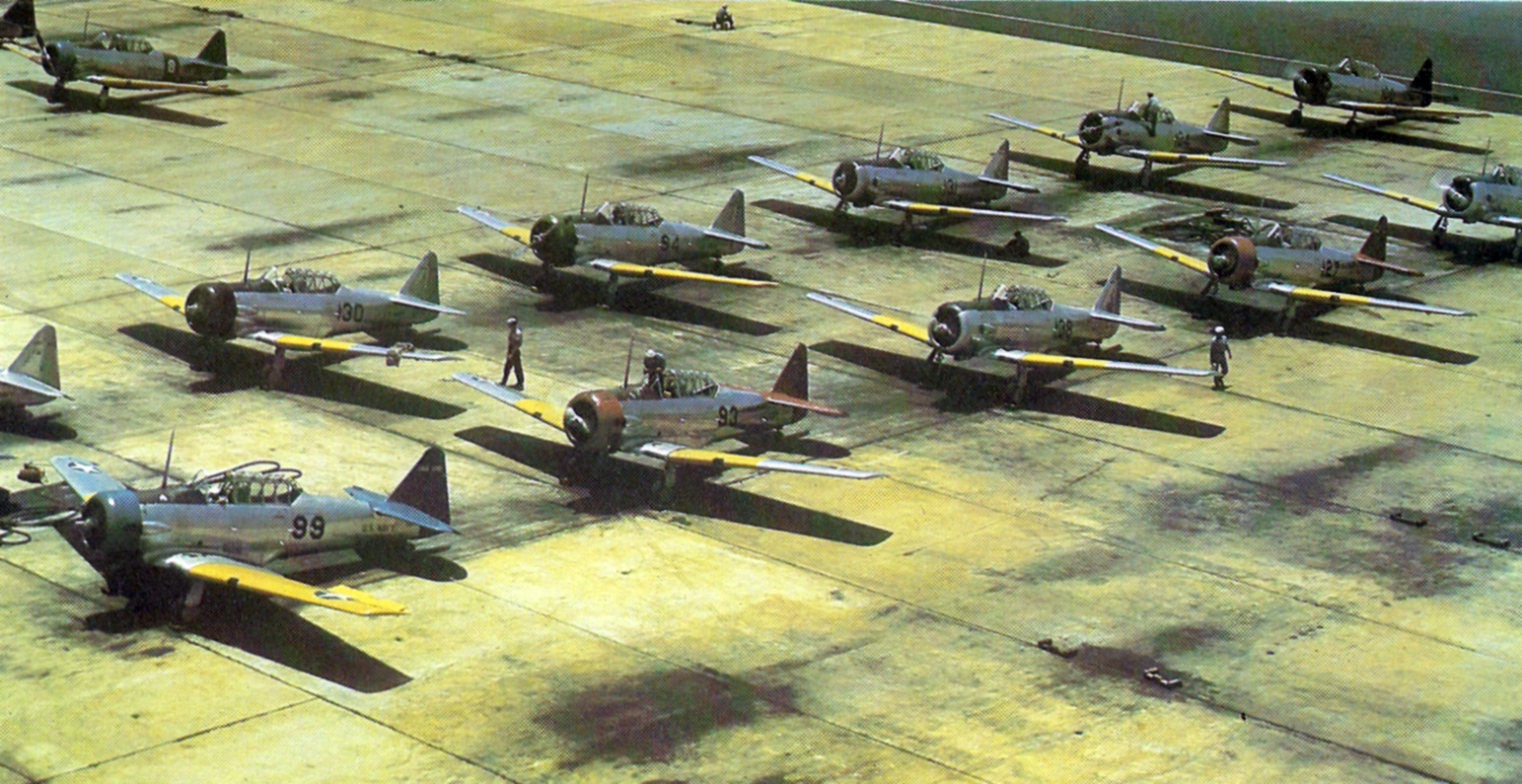
US Navy North American SNJ-4s warming up for training at NAS Corpus Christi circa 1943.

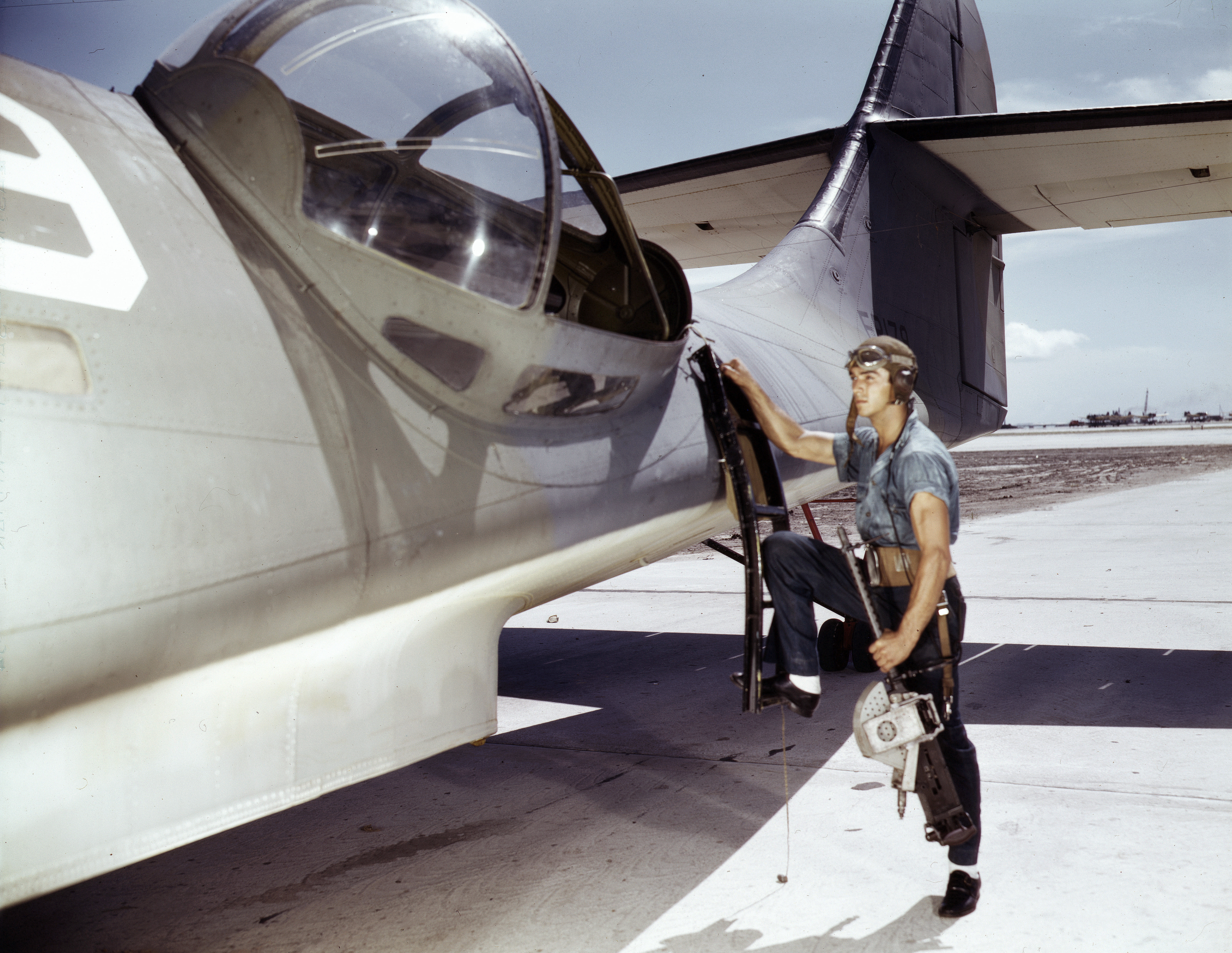
Aviation Ordnanceman stationed at the Naval Air Station Corpus Christi boarding a PBY Catalina, circa 1942

In 1941, 800 instructors provided training for more than 300 student pilots a month. The training rate nearly doubled after the bombing of Pearl Harbor. By the end of World War II, more than 35,000 naval aviators had earned their wings there. Corpus Christi provided intermediate flight training in World War II, training naval pilots to fly SNJ, SNV, SNB, OS2U, PBY, and N3N type airplanes. In 1944 it was the largest naval aviation training facility in the world. The facility covered 20,000 acres (81 km^{2}), and had 997 hangars, shops, barracks, warehouses and other buildings.

Future President George H. W. Bush was the youngest pilot to receive his wings at NAS Corpus Christi in June 1943. NAS Corpus Christi also was home to the Blue Angels from 1951 to 1954. It also served as a Project Mercury Tracking station in the early 1960s.

=== 2002 murder ===
On June 27, 2002, Alfred Bourgeois, a long-haul truck driver who often took his family with him on work trips, was making a delivery at NAS Corpus Christi. As he backed his truck into a loading dock, his 2-year-old daughter accidentally jostled her potty chair and tipped it over. Bourgeois then murdered his daughter after he slammed her head into the interior of his truck with force. He then left her, mortally injured, to carry on with his work. His daughter was found unresponsive by the side of his tractor-trailer. She died the following day and Bourgeois was charged with her murder. Because the murder occurred on a military base, which is classed as federal property, Bourgeois was tried in a federal court as opposed to a state court. In 2004, he was found guilty of her murder and was sentenced to death. In 2020, he was executed by the federal government.

=== 2020 shooting ===
On May 21, 2020, a motorist crashed through a northern perimeter gate at NAS Corpus Christi, activating vehicle barriers that stopped the vehicle. The driver then got out and opened fire before being shot and killed. A Navy police officer was shot but was protected by a ballistic vest. Officials with the FBI announced the incident was terrorism-related and a second person of interest may be at large. The shooter was later identified as Adam Alsalhi, a 20-year-old Corpus Christi resident born in Syria, who had expressed support for ISIS and Al-Qaeda in the Arabian Peninsula. The incident was the second fatal shooting and the fourth security incident that caused NAS Corpus Christi to be locked down since February 2019.

== Current operations ==
Today, the Naval Aviator training program at NAS Corpus Christi is much longer, approximately 18 months, due to the increased complexity of today's aircraft. Currently, Training Air Wing FOUR produces approximately 400 newly qualified aviators each year via the "Maritime Pipeline" for shore-based U.S. Navy, U.S. Marine Corps and U.S. Coast Guard fixed-wing jet and turboprop aircraft, as well as a limited number of NATO/Allied/Coalition military pilots for similar aircraft.

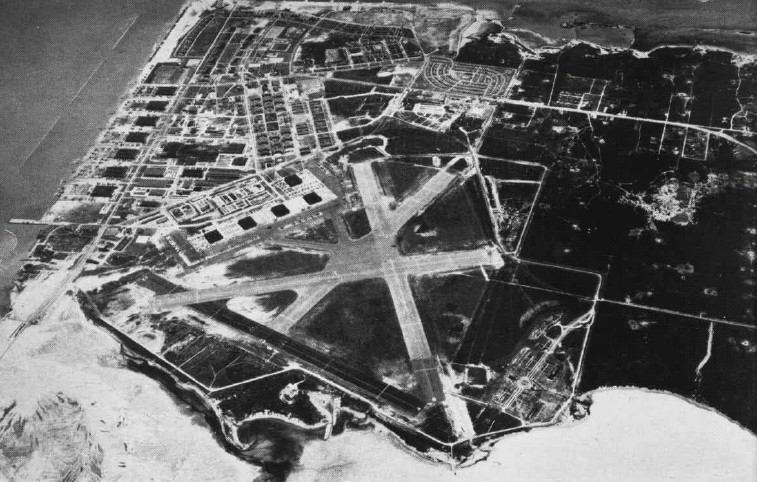
NAS Corpus Christi in 1946 or 1947

Training Air Wing FOUR consists of four squadrons. VT-27 and VT-28 handle primary training in the T-6B Texan II, a single engine turboprop aircraft. VT-31 and VT-35 conduct advanced multi-engine training in the T-44C Pegasus and the T-54A Marlin II. The T-54A is replacing the T-44C as the Navy's advanced multi-engine aircraft.

Other aircraft found at NAS Corpus Christi include the P-3 Orions and General Atomics MQ-9 Reaper drones operated by U.S. Customs and Border Protection.

In addition to U.S. Navy Student Naval Aviators, VT-31 and VT-35 also train Student Naval Aviators from the U.S. Marine Corps and U.S. Coast Guard. The station employs officer, enlisted and civilian personnel serving in the U.S. Navy, U.S. Marine Corps, U.S. Coast Guard, U.S. Army, U.S. Customs and Border Protection and the military services of numerous NATO/Allied/Coalition partner nations.

In support of the base's training mission are three nearby outlying landing fields owned by the Navy: Naval Outlying Field Waldron, which is 3.5 miles (5.6 km) southwest of the Naval Air Station, Naval Outlying Field Cabaniss, which is 8.0 miles (12.9 km) west of the Naval Air Station and Naval Outlying Field Goliad which is 57.7 miles (92.9 km) north of the Naval Air Station.

NAS Corpus Christi is also home to the Corpus Christi Army Depot (CCAD), the largest helicopter repair facility in the world and an unusual arrangement of an Army installation located on a Naval facility. In addition to its military mission, Corpus Christi Army Depot has made a significant economic impact on South Texas. The depot employs thousands of civilian and military personnel and supports additional jobs throughout the region. According to the Texas Comptroller, the depot generated an estimated economic impact of approximately $1.4 billion in 2023.

== Units ==
=== Major Commands ===
- Chief of Naval Air Training (CNATRA)
- Corpus Christi Army Depot (CCAD)
- Marine Aviation Training Support Group (MATSG-22)
- Naval Health Clinic Corpus Christi (NHCCC)

=== Wings ===
- Training Air Wing FOUR (TW4)

=== Squadrons ===
Primary
- VT-27 Boomers
- VT-28 Rangers
Advanced
- VT-31 Wise Owls
- VT-35 Stingrays

=== Other Tenants ===
- U.S. Navy Reserve Navy Operational Support Center (NOSC)
- Fleet and Industrial Supply Center Jacksonville Det Corpus Christi (FISC JAX Det Corpus Christi)
- Marine Aviation Training Support Group (MATSG)
- U.S. Customs and Border Protection (CBP)

== Facilities and service also located on the installation ==
- Corpus Christi Army Depot
- Commissary
- DLA Distribution Corpus Christi, Texas
- Naval Aviation Forecast Detachment Corpus Christi
- Navy Exchange
- Navy Lodge
- Surveillance Support Center (SSC)
- Veterinary Treatment Facility

== See also ==
- List of United States Navy airfields
