= 2023 Northwestern State Demons football team =

American college football season

2023 Northwestern State Demons football
- Conference: Southland Conference
- Record: 0–6 (0–2 Southland)
- Head coach: Brad Laird (6th season)
- Offensive coordinator: Beau Blair (2nd season)
- Offensive scheme: Spread
- Defensive coordinator: Weston Glaser (2nd season)
- Base defense: 3–3–5
- Home stadium: Harry Turpin Stadium

2023 Southland Conference football standings
| | Conf. | | | Overall |
| Team | W | | L | W | | L |
|---|---|---|---|---|---|---|
| Nicholls $^ | 7 | – | 0 | 6 | – | 5 |
| No. 22 Incarnate Word | 6 | – | 1 | 8 | – | 2 |
| Lamar | 5 | – | 2 | 6 | – | 5 |
| Houston Christian | 4 | – | 3 | 5 | – | 5 |
| Southeastern Louisiana | 3 | – | 4 | 3 | – | 8 |
| Texas A&M–Commerce * | 2 | – | 5 | 1 | – | 9 |
| McNeese | 1 | – | 6 | 0 | – | 10 |
| Northwestern State ** | 0 | – | 2 | 0 | – | 6 |
$ – Conference champion; ^ – FCS playoff participant; * – Texas A&M–Commerce ineligible for FCS postseason play due to transition from NCAA Division II. ** – Northwestern State canceled its season on October 26.; Rankings from STATS Poll

The 2023 Northwestern State Demons football team represented Northwestern State University as a member of the Southland Conference during the 2023 NCAA Division I FCS football season. Led by sixth-year head coach Brad Laird, the Demons played their home games at Harry Turpin Stadium in Natchitoches, Louisiana. On October 26, Laird announced that he had resigned and the remainder of the season would be cancelled due to the death of Ronnie Caldwell.

== Death of Ronnie Caldwell ==
On the morning of October 12, junior safety Ronnie Caldwell died after having been shot multiple times. The Demons' following game, against Nicholls, was cancelled in response. On October 26, the university announced that Laird had resigned and the remainder of the season would be cancelled.

The day following the murder, Caldwell's roommate, John McIntosh, was arrested by Natchitoches police for possession of a firearm in the presence of a controlled dangerous substance. At the time, police did not say if McIntosh was involved in Caldwell's death but did confirm that McIntosh had previously been arrested for attempted second-degree murder. On October 20, defensive tackle Maurice Campbell was arrested in connection to Caldwell's death. Campbell was cited for obstruction of justice, possession of marijuana with the intent to distribute, and possession of a firearm in the presence of a controlled dangerous substance.

On November 5, Caldwell's parents filed a wrongful death lawsuit against the Quad Apartment Complex, where Caldwell lived and where the shooting occurred, Laird, and NSU. According to the lawsuit, Caldwell was placed in an apartment with McIntosh, who was not attending college and had a history of legal trouble, after mold was found in Caldwell's original apartment. The lawsuit also alleges that McIntosh pulled a gun on Caldwell three days before the shooting occurred. Caldwell then notified his father, Ronald, of the incident who then alerted Laird. Laird called Ronald, assuring him that he would immediately place Ronnie in a safe location. The university was dropped from the suit on November 18, 2024.

== Preseason ==
=== Preseason poll ===
The Southland Conference released their preseason poll on July 24, 2023. The Demons were picked to finish fifth in the conference.

=== Preseason All–Southland Teams ===
The Southland Conference announced the 2023 preseason all-conference football team selections on July 21, 2023. NSU had a total of 6 players selected.

Offense

1st Team

- Travon Jones – tight end/halfback, SO
- Zach Patterson – wide receiver, SR

2nd Team

- Scooter Adams – running back, RS-SR
- Ke'Nard King – wide receiver, JR
- D'Andre Richard – offensive lineman, JR

Defense

1st Team

- Kevin Davis – defensive back, JR

== Schedule ==
| Date | Time | Opponent | Site | TV | Result | Attendance |
|---|---|---|---|---|---|---|
| September 2 | 7:30 p.m. | at Louisiana* | Cajun Field; Lafayette, LA | ESPN+ | L 13–38 | 18,186 |
| September 9 | 6:00 p.m. | at Louisiana Tech* | Joe Aillet Stadium; Ruston, LA (rivalry) | ESPN+ | L 21–51 | 19,152 |
| September 16 | 6:00 p.m. | Stephen F. Austin* | Harry Turpin Stadium; Natchitoches, LA (Chief Caddo) | ESPN+ | L 7–41 | 6,486 |
| September 30 | 6:00 p.m. | Eastern Illinois* | Harry Turpin Stadium; Natchitoches, LA | ESPN+ | L 10–19 | 6,021 |
| October 7 | 3:00 p.m. | at Lamar | Provost Umphrey Stadium; Beaumont, TX | ESPN+ | L 13–27 | 5,263 |
| October 14 | 3:00 p.m. | at Nicholls | Manning Field at John L. Guidry Stadium; Thibodaux, LA (NSU Challenge) | ESPN+ | Cancelled | |
| October 19 | 7:00 p.m. | Southeastern Louisiana | Harry Turpin Stadium; Natchitoches, LA (rivalry) | ESPN+ | L 20–37 | 2,237 |
| October 28 | 7:00 p.m. | at McNeese | Cowboy Stadium; Lake Charles, LA (rivalry) | ESPN+ | Cancelled | |
| November 4 | 2:00 p.m. | Houston Christian^{†} | Harry Turpin Stadium; Natchitoches, LA | ESPN+ | Cancelled | |
| November 11 | 2:00 p.m. | at No. 16 Incarnate Word | Gayle and Tom Benson Stadium; San Antonio, TX | ESPN+ | Cancelled | |
| November 18 | 2:00 p.m. | Texas A&M–Commerce | Harry Turpin Stadium; Natchitoches, LA | ESPN+ | Cancelled | |
*Non-conference game; ^{†}Homecoming; Rankings from STATS Poll released prior to the game; All times are in Central time

== Personnel ==
2023 Northwestern State Demons football team roster
Players
Coaches
Offense

| Pos. | # | Name | Class |
|---|---|---|---|
| TE | 0 | Travon Jones | So |
| WR | 1 | Zach Patterson | Sr |
| RB | 2 | Kennieth Lacy | Jr |
| WR | 3 | Jaheim Walters | So |
| WR | 4 | Ke'Nard King | Jr |
| WR | 5 | Jaren Mitchell | Sr |
| RB | 6 | Scooter Adams | Sr |
| QB | 7 | Kareame Cotton Jr. | So |
| QB | 8 | Tyler Vander Waal | Sr |
| WR | 9 | Kobe Stewart | So |
| QB | 10 | Quaterius Hawkins | Sr |
| WR | 11 | Twon Hines | Jr |
| WR | 13 | Myles Kent-Denton | Jr |
| QB | 14 | J. T. Fayard | Fr |
| TE | 15 | Sylvester Campbell III | Sr |
| TE | 17 | Chance Newman | Sr |
| WR | 18 | Dennis Smith | Sr |
| WR | 20 | Hogan Wasson | Fr |
| RB | 21 | Kolbe Burrell | So |
| RB | 22 | Duce Hart | Fr |
| RB | 25 | Darius Boone Jr. | Jr |
| WR | 30 | Micah Jernigan | Jr |
| RB | 35 | SirMichael Veasley | So |
| RB | 40 | Brian Banks | Fr |
| TE | 42 | Gage Ridgel | Jr |
| OL | 50 | Cameron Vaughn | Jr |
| OL | 51 | Ta'Von Burrows | Jr |
| C | 53 | Quentin Ross | Jr |
| OL | 56 | Matt Mabry | Jr |
| OL | 57 | Riley Birdwell | So |
| OL | 58 | Coby James | So |
| OL | 62 | Chris Allen | Fr |
| OL | 65 | Brayden Staggs | So |
| OL | 67 | Jordan Cooper | Jr |
| OL | 68 | Cole LaFleur | Fr |
| OL | 69 | Nicholas Soileau | Fr |
| OL | 70 | Hanzlah Rana | Fr |
| OL | 71 | Stevie Ballard | Jr |
| OL | 72 | Jay Stroble | So |
| OL | 73 | Tyrone Butler | Fr |
| OL | 74 | Ryan Larson | Fr |
| OL | 75 | Jordan McClaine | So |
| OL | 77 | Tyler McMillan | So |
| WR | 81 | T. J. Johnson | Fr |
| WR | 82 | Jarien Brown | Fr |
| WR | 84 | Devin Thierry | So |
| WR | 86 | Amaaz Eugene | Fr |
| WR | 88 | Stanley King | Jr |
| WR | 89 | Dane Wallace | Fr |

Defense

| Pos. | # | Name | Class |
|---|---|---|---|
| S | 1 | Peyton Woulard | Sr |
| LB | 2 | Justice Galloway-Velazquez | Sr |
| LB | 6 | Jordan Banks | So |
| CB | 7 | Anthony Richard | So |
| LB | 8 | Jaeden Ward | Sr |
| S | 9 | Cam Hardy | So |
| S | 10 | Isaiah Robinson | So |
| CB | 11 | Reggie Strong | Jr |
| DE | 13 | Jeremiah Bodwin | So |
| S | 14 | Cadillac Rhone | So |
| CB | 15 | Ty Hall | So |
| S | 16 | William White | So |
| S | 17 | D. J. Johnson | Fr |
| CB | 18 | Justus Joseph | Fr |
| CB | 19 | Emanuel Brown | So |
| S | 20 | Kevin Davis Jr. | Jr |
| LB | 21 | Jared Pedraza | Jr |
| S | 23 | Ronnie Caldwell | Jr |
| DE | 24 | Trevion Sneed | So |
| CB | 26 | Perry Taylor | Jr |
| S | 27 | Antwon Fegans | So |
| CB | 28 | Antonio Hall | Fr |
| CB | 30 | Troy Santa Marina Jr. | Fr |
| LB | 31 | Matthew Broad | So |
| S | 32 | Ara Rauls III | Jr |
| DE | 33 | Ty Ely | So |
| LB | 35 | Ja'Quel Mack | Fr |
| DE | 36 | Christian Thomas | Fr |
| CB | 37 | Keelan Preston | Fr |
| CB | 38 | Daniel Dufour | Fr |
| CB | 39 | Ja'Marion Bonner | Fr |
| LB | 40 | Tory Morgan | Fr |
| S | 42 | Jeremiah Keppard | Fr |
| LB | 43 | Kyren Brown | Jr |
| LB | 45 | Danny Sears | Fr |
| CB | 48 | Justin Aaron | Fr |
| S | 48 | Brian Young | Fr |
| DE | 49 | Christian Hawkins | So |
| LB | 50 | Brendon Harris | Fr |
| LB | 51 | Chad Gooden Jr. | Fr |
| LB | 52 | Connor Norcross | So |
| DE | 54 | Kendal Harmon | So |
| DT | 59 | Maurice Campbell II (S) | Sr |
| DE | 90 | Chancellor Owens | Fr |
| DT | 91 | Christian Davis | Fr |
| DT | 92 | Keshawn Reed | Fr |
| DT | 93 | Ray Gibson | Jr |
| DL | 94 | Peyton Beckley | Sr |
| DL | 95 | Johnny Mitchell | So |
| DT | 97 | Nazir Sy | Sr |
| DE | 98 | Jordon Williams | Fr |
| DT | 99 | Donovan Green | Jr |

Special teams

| Pos. | # | Name | Class |
|---|---|---|---|
| K | 29 | Brett Money | So |
| K, P | 43 | Reed Honshtein | So |
| K, P | 46 | Scotty Roblow | Jr |
| LS | 47 | Andrew Barnhill | So |
| LS | 55 | Sawyer Benson | Fr |
| K, P | 82 | Evan Kern | Fr |
| P | 83 | Kentrell Molette | Fr |

Head coach

- Brad Laird

Coordinators/assistant coaches

- Beau Blair
  Offensive coordinator/Running
  backs/Tight ends
- Weston Glaser
  Assistant head coach/Defensive coordinator/Safeties
- Jeremy Atwell
  Linebackers
- Perry Carter
  Cornerbacks
- Boone Feldt
  Offensive line
- Chris Gistorb
  Defensive line
- Armani Lonardo
  Wide receivers
- Kyle Washington
  Quarterbacks

Legend

- (C) Team captain
- (S) Suspended
- (I) Ineligible
- Injured
- Redshirt

Roster
Last update: November 28, 2023

== Game summaries ==
=== At Louisiana ===
Northwestern State Demons at Louisiana Ragin' Cajuns – Game summary

| Quarter | 1 | 2 | 3 | 4 | Total |
|---|---|---|---|---|---|
| Demons | 3 | 3 | 0 | 7 | 13 |
| Ragin' Cajuns | 7 | 14 | 7 | 10 | 38 |

at Cajun Field, Lafayette, Louisiana

- Date: September 2
- Game time: 7:30 p.m. CDT
- Game weather: Sunny, 85 °F (29 °C)
- Game attendance: 18,186
- Referee: Scott Broadway
- TV announcers (ESPN+): Dan McDonald and Eric Mouton
- Box score, Recap

Game information
First quarter
- UL – Dre'lyn Washington 62-yard run (Kenneth Almendares kick), 11:55. Ragin' Cajuns 7–0. Drive: 2 plays, 67 yards, 0:53.
- NWST – Brett Money 37-yard field goal, 4:49. Ragin' Cajuns 7–3. Drive: 4 plays, -6 yards, 1:47.

Second quarter

- UL – Ben Wooldridge 24-yard run (Kenneth Almendares kick), 11:39. Ragin' Cajuns 14–3. Drive: 4 plays, 41 yards, 1:19.
- UL – Robert Williams 32-yard pass from Ben Wooldridge (Kenneth Almendares kick), 9:09. Ragin' Cajuns 21–3. Drive: 4 plays, 42 yards, 1:37.
- NWST – Brett Money 41-yard field goal, 2:17. Ragin' Cajuns 21–6. Drive: 8 plays, 17 yards, 3:10.

Third quarter

- UL – Peter LeBlanc 50-yard pass from Ben Wooldridge (Kenneth Almendares kick), 9:28. Ragin' Cajuns 28–6. Drive: 4 plays, 77 yards, 1:48.

Fourth quarter

- UL – Kenneth Almendares 33-yard field goal, 14:55. Ragin' Cajuns 31–6. Drive: 7 plays, 48 yards, 3:15.
- UL – Tavion Smith 21-yard pass from Ben Wooldridge (Kenneth Almendares kick), 4:59. Ragin' Cajuns 38–6. Drive: 10 plays, 68 yards, 5:23.
- NWST – Scooter Adams 47-yard pass from Tyler Vander Waal (Brett Money kick), 2:01. Ragin' Cajuns 38–13. Drive: 6 plays, 65 yards, 2:58.

| Statistics | NWST | UL |
|---|---|---|
| First downs | 8 | 20 |
| Total yards | 187 | 429 |
| Rushing yards | 77 | 206 |
| Passing yards | 110 | 223 |
| Turnovers | 1 | 3 |
| Time of possession | 32:58 | 27:02 |

| Team | Category | Player | Statistics |
|---|---|---|---|
| Northwestern State | Passing | Tyler Vander Waal | 12/28, 110 yards, TD |
| Northwestern State | Rushing | Scooter Adams | 8 rushes, 33 yards |
| Northwestern State | Receiving | Scooter Adams | 2 receptions, 48 yards, TD |
| Louisiana | Passing | Ben Wooldridge | 14/32, 223 yards, 3 TD, INT |
| Louisiana | Rushing | Drelyn Washington | 8 rushes, 88 yards, TD |
| Louisiana | Receiving | Peter LeBlanc | 2 receptions, 58 yards, TD |

=== At Louisiana Tech ===
Northwestern State Demons at Louisiana Tech Bulldogs – Game summary

| Quarter | 1 | 2 | 3 | 4 | Total |
|---|---|---|---|---|---|
| Demons | 7 | 7 | 7 | 0 | 21 |
| Bulldogs | 10 | 21 | 20 | 0 | 51 |

at Joe Aillet Stadium, Ruston, Louisiana

- Date: September 9
- Game time: 6:00 p.m. CDT
- Game weather: Sunny, 85 °F (29 °C)
- Game attendance: 19,152
- Referee: Ed Ardito
- TV announcers (ESPN+): Lyn Rollins, Chris Mykoskie, and Madison Kaufman
- Box score, Recap

Game information
First quarter
- LT – Tyre Shelton 41-yard run (Jacob Barnes kick), 10:28. Bulldogs 7–0. Drive: 4 plays, 74 yards, 1:54.
- LT – Jacob Barnes 22-yard field goal, 5:57. Bulldogs 10–0. Drive: 5 plays, 42 yards, 1:52.
- NWST – Scooter Adams 11-yard pass from Tyler Vander Waal (Brett Money kick), 0:32. Bulldogs 10–7. Drive: 3 plays, 61 yards, 1:08.

Second quarter

- LT – Keith Willis Jr. 65-yard run (Jacob Barnes kick), 11:41. Bulldogs 17–7. Drive: 1 play, 65 yards, 0:09.
- NWST – Tyler Vander Waal 9-yard run (Brett Money kick), 5:41. Bulldogs 17–14. Drive: 11 plays, 73 yards, 4:34.
- LT – Koby Duru 11-yard pass from Hank Bachmeier (Jacob Barnes kick), 3:18. Bulldogs 24–14. Drive: 6 plays, 55 yards, 2:21.
- LT – Charvis Thornton 30-yard run (Jacob Barnes kick), 1:17. Bulldogs 31–14. Drive: 1 play, 30 yards, 0:08.

Third quarter

- NWST – Kolbe Burrell 2-yard run (Brett Money kick), 13:37. Bulldogs 31–21. Drive: 4 plays, 30 yards, 1:14.
- LT – Jacob Barnes 36-yard field goal, 9:45. Bulldogs 34–21. Drive: 9 plays, 56 yards, 3:52.
- LT – Keith Willis Jr. 68-yard run (Jacob Barnes kick), 8:06. Bulldogs 41–21. Drive: 1 play, 68 yards, 0:11.
- LT – Cedric Woods 49-yard interception return (Jacob Barnes kick), 7:52. Bulldogs 48–21.
- LT – Jacob Barnes 32-yard field goal, 1:18. Bulldogs 51–21. Drive: 11 plays, 55 yards, 4:01.

Fourth quarter

- No scoring plays

| Statistics | NWST | LT |
|---|---|---|
| First downs | 20 | 22 |
| Total yards | 324 | 478 |
| Rushing yards | 185 | 367 |
| Passing yards | 139 | 111 |
| Turnovers | 3 | 2 |
| Time of possession | 31:41 | 28:19 |

| Team | Category | Player | Statistics |
|---|---|---|---|
| Northwestern State | Passing | Tyler Vander Waal | 10/24, 134 yards, TD, 3 INT |
| Northwestern State | Rushing | Kolbe Burrell | 11 rushes, 56 yards, TD |
| Northwestern State | Receiving | Jaren Mitchell | 4 receptions, 60 yards |
| Louisiana Tech | Passing | Hank Bachmeier | 9/18, 110 yards, TD |
| Louisiana Tech | Rushing | Keith Willis Jr. | 13 rushes, 188 yards, 2 TD |
| Louisiana Tech | Receiving | Kyle Maxwell | 1 reception, 42 yards |

=== Stephen F. Austin ===
Stephen F. Austin Lumberjacks at Northwestern State Demons – Game summary

| Quarter | 1 | 2 | 3 | 4 | Total |
|---|---|---|---|---|---|
| Lumberjacks | 21 | 13 | 7 | 0 | 41 |
| Demons | 0 | 0 | 0 | 7 | 7 |

at Harry Turpin Stadium, Natchitoches, Louisiana

- Date: September 16
- Game time: 6:00 p.m. CDT
- Game weather: Sunny, 88 °F (31 °C)
- Game attendance: 6,486
- Referee: James Brookhart
- TV: ESPN+
- Box score, Recap

Game information
First quarter
- SFA – Brian Maurer 4-yard run (Chris Campos kick), 12:14. Lumberjacks 7–0. Drive: 6 plays, 75 yards, 2:46.
- SFA – Amad Murray 25-yard fumble return (Chris Campos kick), 10:19. Lumberjacks 14–0.
- SFA – Kylon Harris 8-yard pass from Brian Maurer (Chris Campos kick), 8:49. Lumberjacks 21–0. Drive: 2 plays, 14 yards, 0:41.

Second quarter

- SFA – Anthony Williams 50-yard pass from Brian Maurer (Chris Campos kick), 10:38. Lumberjacks 28–0. Drive: 1 play, 50 yards, 0:09.
- SFA – Chris Campos 23-yard field goal, 2:33. Lumberjacks 31–0. Drive: 11 plays, 39 yards, 6:01.
- SFA – Chris Campos 30-yard field goal, 0:23. Lumberjacks 34–0. Drive: 9 plays, 22 yards, 1:18.

Third quarter

- SFA – Anthony Williams 53-yard pass from Brian Maurer (Chris Campos kick), 8:29. Lumberjacks 41–0. Drive: 1 play, 53 yards, 0:08.

Fourth quarter

- NWST – Jaren Mitchell 20-yard pass from Quaterius Hawkins (Brett Money kick), 14:37. Lumberjacks 41–7. Drive: 7 plays, 53 yards, 1:36.

| Statistics | SFA | NWST |
|---|---|---|
| First downs | 18 | 11 |
| Total yards | 454 | 208 |
| Rushing yards | 186 | 84 |
| Passing yards | 268 | 124 |
| Turnovers | 1 | 6 |
| Time of possession | 35:00 | 25:00 |

| Team | Category | Player | Statistics |
|---|---|---|---|
| Stephen F. Austin | Passing | Brian Maurer | 12/22, 199 yards, 3 TD, INT |
| Stephen F. Austin | Rushing | Jerrell Wimbley | 16 rushes, 115 yards |
| Stephen F. Austin | Receiving | Anthony Williams | 2 receptions, 103 yards, 2 TD |
| Northwestern State | Passing | Quaterius Hawkins | 7/19, 62 yards, TD, 2 INT |
| Northwestern State | Rushing | Scooter Adams | 9 rushes, 65 yards |
| Northwestern State | Receiving | Jaren Mitchell | 3 receptions, 35 yards, TD |

=== Eastern Illinois ===
Eastern Illinois Panthers at Northwestern State Demons – Game summary

| Quarter | 1 | 2 | 3 | 4 | Total |
|---|---|---|---|---|---|
| Panthers | 3 | 7 | 6 | 3 | 19 |
| Demons | 3 | 7 | 0 | 0 | 10 |

at Harry Turpin Stadium, Natchitoches, Louisiana

- Date: September 30
- Game time: 6:00 p.m. CDT
- Game weather: Sunny, 91 °F (33 °C)
- Game attendance: 6,021
- Referee: Gary Leeper
- TV: ESPN+
- Box score, Recap

Game information
First quarter
- NWST – Brett Money 23-yard field goal, 6:43. Demons 3–0. Drive: 12 plays, 50 yards, 4:26.
- EIU – Julian Patino 23-yard field goal, 0:05. Tied 3–3. Drive: 8 plays, 26 yards, 3:02.

Second quarter

- EIU – Justin Bowick 52-yard pass from Pierce Holley (Julian Patino kick), 10:28. Panthers 10–3. Drive: 2 plays, 67 yards, 0:40.
- NWST – Chance Newman 1-yard run (Brett Money kick), 2:28. Tied 10–10. Drive: 7 plays, 90 yards, 3:08.

Third quarter

- EIU – Kevin Daniels 6-yard run (kick failed), 11:54. Panthers 16–10. Drive: 7 plays, 71 yards, 3:04.

Fourth quarter

- EIU – Stone Galloway 22-yard field goal, 8:03. Panthers 19–10. Drive: 7 plays, 19 yards, 2:52.

| Statistics | EIU | NWST |
|---|---|---|
| First downs | 18 | 19 |
| Total yards | 349 | 350 |
| Rushing yards | 75 | 69 |
| Passing yards | 274 | 281 |
| Turnovers | 1 | 3 |
| Time of possession | 28:25 | 31:35 |

| Team | Category | Player | Statistics |
|---|---|---|---|
| Eastern Illinois | Passing | Pierce Holley | 19/37, 274 yards, TD |
| Eastern Illinois | Rushing | M. J. Flowers | 15 rushes, 48 yards |
| Eastern Illinois | Receiving | Justin Bowick | 4 receptions, 130 yards, TD |
| Northwestern State | Passing | Quaterius Hawkins | 27/44, 281 yards, INT |
| Northwestern State | Rushing | Scooter Adams | 9 rushes, 29 yards |
| Northwestern State | Receiving | Zach Patterson | 7 receptions, 74 yards |

=== At Lamar ===
Northwestern State Demons at Lamar Cardinals – Game summary

| Quarter | 1 | 2 | 3 | 4 | Total |
|---|---|---|---|---|---|
| Demons | 0 | 7 | 6 | 0 | 13 |
| Cardinals | 7 | 6 | 0 | 14 | 27 |

at Provost Umphrey Stadium, Beaumont, Texas

- Date: October 7
- Game time: 3:00 p.m. CDT
- Game weather: Sunny, 80 °F (27 °C)
- Game attendance: 5,263
- Referee: Matt Beck
- TV: ESPN+
- Box score, Recap

Game information
First quarter
- LAM – Khalan Griffin 3-yard run (Chris Esqueda kick), 8:22. Cardinals 7–0. Drive: 13 plays, 75 yards, 6:38.

Second quarter

- NWST – Chance Newman 1-yard run (Brett Money kick), 11:17. Tied 7–7. Drive: 8 plays, 41 yards, 3:34.
- LAM – Damashja Harris 95-yard kickoff return (kick failed), 11:03. Cardinals 13–7.

Third quarter

- NWST – Brett Money 48-yard field goal, 9:55. Cardinals 13–10. Drive: 11 plays, 32 yards, 4:59.
- NWST – Brett Money 45-yard field goal, 0:08. Tied 13–13. Drive: 4 plays, 1 yard, 0:56.

Fourth quarter

- LAM – Andre Dennis 45-yard pass from Robert Coleman (Chris Esqueda kick), 13:58. Cardinals 20–13. Drive: 4 plays, 75 yards, 1:10.
- LAM – R. J. Carver 3-yard run (Chris Esqueda kick), 4:18. Cardinals 27–13. Drive: 5 plays, 15 yards, 2:16.

| Statistics | NWST | LAM |
|---|---|---|
| First downs | 16 | 15 |
| Total yards | 221 | 265 |
| Rushing yards | 81 | 122 |
| Passing yards | 140 | 143 |
| Turnovers | 1 | 0 |
| Time of possession | 29:52 | 30:08 |

| Team | Category | Player | Statistics |
|---|---|---|---|
| Northwestern State | Passing | Quaterius Hawkins | 20/33, 140 yards, INT |
| Northwestern State | Rushing | Kennieth Lacy | 6 rushes, 28 yards |
| Northwestern State | Receiving | Zach Patterson | 4 receptions, 42 yards |
| Lamar | Passing | Robert Coleman | 9/20, 143 yards, TD |
| Lamar | Rushing | Khalan Griffin | 18 rushes, 93 yards, TD |
| Lamar | Receiving | Andre Dennis | 3 receptions, 78 yards, TD |

=== Southeastern Louisiana ===
Southeastern Louisiana Lions at Northwestern State Demons – Game summary

| Quarter | 1 | 2 | 3 | 4 | Total |
|---|---|---|---|---|---|
| Lions | 14 | 7 | 13 | 3 | 37 |
| Demons | 10 | 7 | 0 | 3 | 20 |

at Harry Turpin Stadium, Natchitoches, Louisiana

- Date: October 19
- Game time: 7:00 p.m. CDT
- Game weather: Clear, 76 °F (24 °C)
- Game attendance: 2,237
- Referee: Matt Back
- TV: ESPN+
- Box score, Recap

Game information
First quarter
- SELA – Bauer Sharp 1-yard run (Riley Callaghan kick), 12:26. Lions 7–0. Drive: 6 plays, 75 yards, 2:34.
- NWST – Tyler Vander Waal 2-yard run (Brett Money kick), 9:09. Tied 7–7. Drive: 9 plays, 75 yards, 3:17.
- SELA – Da'shun Hugley 22-yard run (Riley Callaghan kick), 6:33. Lions 14–7. Drive: 7 plays, 82 yards, 2:31.
- NWST – Brett Money 38-yard field goal, 0:12. Lions 14–10. Drive: 8 plays, 68 yards, 4:12.

Second quarter

- NWST – Stanley King 29-yard pass from Tyler Vander Waal (Brett Money kick), 13:16. Demons 17–14. Drive: 3 plays, 33 yards, 1:01.
- SELA – Zachary Clement 4-yard run (Riley Callaghan kick), 8:39. Lions 21–17. Drive: 8 plays, 51 yards, 4:28.

Third quarter

- SELA – Victor Tademy 58-yard interception return (Riley Callaghan kick), 13:33. Lions 28–17.
- SELA – Deantre Jackson 81-yard run (kick blocked), 7:50. Lions 34–17. Drive: 4 plays, 93 yards, 1:22.

Fourth quarter

- NWST – Brett Money 22-yard field goal, 14:15. Lions 34–20. Drive: 6 plays, 14 yards, 1:57.
- SELA – Riley Callaghan 30-yard field goal, 10:28. Lions 37–20. Drive: 7 plays, 46 yards, 3:46.

| Statistics | SELA | NWST |
|---|---|---|
| First downs | 18 | 25 |
| Total yards | 539 | 396 |
| Rushing yards | 219 | 97 |
| Passing yards | 320 | 299 |
| Turnovers | 3 | 2 |
| Time of possession | 28:42 | 31:18 |

| Team | Category | Player | Statistics |
|---|---|---|---|
| Southeastern Louisiana | Passing | Zachary Clement | 12/18, 192 yards, INT |
| Southeastern Louisiana | Rushing | Deantre Jackson | 6 rushes, 119 yards, TD |
| Southeastern Louisiana | Receiving | Darius Lewis | 6 receptions, 109 yards |
| Northwestern State | Passing | Tyler Vander Waal | 27/43, 249 yards, TD, 2 INT |
| Northwestern State | Rushing | Kolbe Burrell | 11 rushes, 49 yards |
| Northwestern State | Receiving | T. J. Johnson | 3 receptions, 57 yards |
