= 2023 Incarnate Word Cardinals football team =

American college football season

2023 Incarnate Word Cardinals football
- Conference: Southland Conference

Ranking
- STATS: No. 22
- FCS Coaches: No. 14
- Record: 9–2 (6–1 Southland)
- Head coach: Clint Killough (1st season)
- Offensive coordinator: Conner McQueen (1st season)
- Offensive scheme: Spread
- Defensive coordinator: Jim Gush (1st season)
- Base defense: 4–2–5
- Captains: Jayden Borjas; Darren Brown; Stanley Mark; Brandon Richard; Chance Trentman-Rosas
- Home stadium: Gayle and Tom Benson Stadium

2023 Southland Conference football standings
	Conf.			Overall
Team	W		L	W		L
Nicholls $^	7	–	0	6	–	5
No. 22 Incarnate Word	6	–	1	8	–	2
Lamar	5	–	2	6	–	5
Houston Christian	4	–	3	5	–	5
Southeastern Louisiana	3	–	4	3	–	8
Texas A&M–Commerce *	2	–	5	1	–	9
McNeese	1	–	6	0	–	10
Northwestern State **	0	–	2	0	–	6
$ – Conference champion; ^ – FCS playoff participant; * – Texas A&M–Commerce ineligible for FCS postseason play due to transition from NCAA Division II. ** – Northwestern State canceled its season on October 26.; Rankings from STATS Poll

The 2023 Incarnate Word Cardinals football team represented the University of the Incarnate Word (UIW) as a member of the Southland Conference during the 2023 NCAA Division I FCS football season. The Cardinals played their home games at Gayle and Tom Benson Stadium in San Antonio, Texas. They were led by first-year head coach Clint Killough.

== Preseason ==
=== Preseason poll ===
The Southland Conference released their preseason poll on July 24, 2023. The Cardinals were picked to finish second in the conference and received seven first-place votes.

=== Preseason All–Southland Teams ===
The Southland Conference announced the 2023 preseason all-conference football team selections on July 21, 2023. UIW had a total of 7 players selected.

Offense

1st Team

- Brandon Porter – Wide receiver, RS-SR
- Stanley Mark – Offensive lineman, RS-SR

2nd Team

- CJ Hardy – Wide receiver, RS-SR

Defense

1st Team

- Steven Parker – Defensive lineman, JR
- Brandon Richard – Defensive back, RS-SR

2nd Team

- Marcus Brown – Defensive lineman, JR
- Dekaylon Taylor – Punt returner, SO

== Schedule ==
Date	Time	Opponent	Rank	Site	TV	Result	Attendance
September 2	8:00 p.m.	at UTEP*	No. 7	Sun Bowl; El Paso, TX	ESPN+	L 14–28	30,738
September 9	3:00 p.m.	at Northern Colorado*	No. 10	Nottingham Field; Greeley, CO	ESPN+	W 42–7	3,898
September 16	7:00 p.m.	at Abilene Christian*	No. 10	Anthony Field at Wildcat Stadium; Abilene, TX	ESPN+	W 27–20	8,280
September 23	6:00 p.m.	North American*	No. 9	Gayle and Tom Benson Stadium; San Antonio, TX	ESPN+	W 63–3	2,482
October 7	4:00 p.m.	Southeastern Louisiana	No. 8	Gayle and Tom Benson Stadium; San Antonio, TX	ESPN+	W 33–26	1,622
October 14	4:00 p.m.	Texas A&M–Commerce	No. 7	Gayle and Tom Benson Stadium; San Antonio, TX	ESPN+	W 28–11	2,278
October 21	7:00 p.m.	at McNeese	No. 5	Cowboy Stadium; Lake Charles, LA	ESPN+	W 35–24	7,415
October 28	3:00 p.m.	at Lamar	No. 8	Provost Umphrey Stadium; Beaumont, TX	ESPN+	W 17–7	6,593
November 4	3:00 p.m.	Nicholls^{†}	No. 8	Gayle and Tom Benson Stadium; San Antonio, TX	ESPN+	L 32–45	3,158
November 11	2:00 p.m.	Northwestern State	No. 16	Gayle and Tom Benson Stadium; San Antonio, TX	ESPN+	W 2–0 (forfeit)	N/A
November 18	2:00 p.m.	at Houston Christian	No. 20	Husky Stadium; Houston, TX	ESPN+	W 45–24	1,797
*Non-conference game; ^{†}Homecoming; Rankings from STATS Poll released prior to the game; All times are in Central time

== Personnel ==
=== Coaching staff ===
Name	Position	Alma mater	Joined staff
Clint Killough	Head coach	Incarnate Word (2015)	2018
Kenny Hill	Associate head coach / running backs	TCU (2017)	2023
Conner McQueen	Offensive coordinator / quarterbacks	Texas A&M (2017)	2023
Jim Gush	Defensive coordinator	Bucknell (1981)	2023
Blair Cavanaugh	Special teams coordinator	Portland State (2016)	2022
Sam Bennett	Linebackers / academic coordinator	Texas Tech (2010)	2023
Ty Darlington	Tight ends / director of high school relations	Oklahoma (2016)	2023
Ben Olson	Defensive line / defensive run game coordinator	Eastern Illinois (2013)	2023
George Sanders	Defensive backs / defensive pass game coordinator	Southwest Baptist (2016)	2023
Willis White	Wide receivers / pass game coordinator	Alabama State (2018)	2023
Austin Woods	Offensive line / run game coordinator	Oklahoma (2013)	2023
Tre Spragg	Defensive quality control	Incarnate Word (2015)	2023
Richard Johnson	Defensive quality control	Kansas (2011)	2023
Nick Young	Recruiting coordinator / senior analyst	Toledo (2012)	2023
Zack Lucas	Director of football operations / NFL liaison	Oklahoma State (2010)	2022
Lauren Mancha	Director of player personnel / campus relations / assistant to the head coach	Incarnate Word (2022)	2022
Cody Dunn	Assistant tight ends	McGill (2021)	2022
John Scifers	Specialists coach / video coordinator	Incarnate Word (2021)	2023
Cameron Venzant	Offensive graduate assistant	Central Arkansas (2022)	2022
Mauricio De La Garza	Offensive graduate assistant	Incarnate Word (2017)	2022
Lamont Johnson	Offensive graduate assistant	Incarnate Word (2019)	2023
Davis Conley	Director of strength and conditioning	LaGrange (2017)	2022
Augie Melendez Jr.	Head football athletic trainer	Texas A&M University–Corpus Christi (2017)	2017

=== Roster ===
2023 Incarnate Word Cardinals football
Quarterback: 1 Zach Calzada – (redshirt) Junior (6'4, 200); 6 Ryan Stubblefield – (redshirt) Sophomore (5'10, 205); 12 Richard Torres – (redshirt) Freshman (6'4, 225); 16 Luke Gombert – (redshirt) Junior (6'2, 185); 22 Solomon James – Freshman (6'0, 180); Running back: 0 Tre Siggers – (redshirt) Senior (5'10, 200); 4 Isaiah Robinson – Senior (6'2, 212); 5 Jarrell Wiley – (redshirt) Junior (5'10, 182); 20 Timothy Carter – Junior (6'0, 215); 23 Jarvis Reed – Freshman (6'0, 180); 25 Tyrese Brown – Junior (5'11, 185); 26 Zach Obara – Freshman (6'3, 195); 28 Nick Meehan – (redshirt) Freshman (5'11, 193); 29 Daniel Fayombo – Freshman (6'0, 180); 30 Dylan Nelson – (redshirt) Freshman (5'10, 169); Wide receiver: 2 CJ Hardy – (redshirt) Senior (5'11, 200); 3 Dekalon Taylor – Sophomore (5'9, 166); 7 Jaelon Travis – (redshirt) Sophomore (6'0, 200); 8 Jameson Garcia – Freshman (6'1, 190); 9 Lontrell Turner – Freshman (5'11, 180); 10 Kailan Noseff – (redshirt) Senior (6'3, 198); 13 Marquez Perez – (redshirt) Senior (5'11, 191); 15 Jaelin Campbell – (redshirt) Senior (6'1, 195); 18 Brandon Porter – (redshirt) Senior (5'10, 165); 19 Baron Bradley – (redshirt) Junior (6'1, 189); 21 Caleb Chapman – (redshirt) Senior (6'5, 220); 83 Grant Jaeger – Freshman (5'8, 160); 84 Jalen Smothers – (redshirt) Junior (5'10, 189); 85 Emerson Haywood – (redshirt) Junior (6'1, 163); 87 Jonathan Johnson – Freshman (6'0, 155); 88 Matthew Ramirez – Freshman (6'0, 160); 89 Marcus Harmon – (redshirt) Senior (5'10, 170); Tight end: 11 Jackson Lowe – (redshirt) Senior (6'5, 237); 27 Dalton Meyer – (redshirt) Senior (6'2, 265); 35 Chance Trentman–Rosas (C) – (redshirt) Senior (6'3, 215); 47 Dane Farley – Freshman (6'1, 230); 80 Jackson Muckelroy – Freshman (6'4, 205); Long snapper: 49 Bryce Felt – Sophomore (5'9, 180); 50 Jake Williford – Freshman (6'3, 255)	Offensive line: 55 River Gordon – G – (redshirt) Sophomore (6'4, 315); 56 Alex Costilla – T – (redshirt) Senior (6'5, 310); 57 Rasheed Jackson – T – Freshman (6'7, 320); 62 Austin DeArmond – T – (redshirt) Freshman (6'4, 294); 63 Stanley Mark (C) – G – (redshirt) Senior (6'3, 283); 65 Ozzy Garcia – OL – Freshman (6'1, 290); 66 Bradley Walker – OL – Freshman (5'11, 220); 67 Trevin Demby – OL – Freshman (6'0, 290); 70 Dayton Robinson – T – (redshirt) Sophomore (6'4, 320); 71 Joe Bryson – T – (redshirt) Senior (6'8, 300); 72 Christian Fitchett – T – Freshman (6'5, 270); 73 Caleb Flores – C – (redshirt) Freshman (6'4, 279); 75 Silas Robinson – C – (redshirt) Senior (6'4, 315); 76 Lawson Petty – G – Freshman (6'3, 280); 77 Jayden Borjas (C) – G/T – (redshirt) Senior (6'5, 295); 78 Branon Jackson – G – (redshirt) Junior (6'3, 295); 79 Joseph Kimmey – T – (redshirt) Senior (6'6, 305); Defensive line: 0 Steven Parker – DE – (redshirt) Junior (6'4, 240); 1 Ayodele Adeoye – DE/LB – (redshirt) Senior (6'1, 250); 8 Chase Carter – DL – (redshirt) Freshman (6'4, 255); 9 Darren Brown (C) – DT – (redshirt) Senior (6'3, 325); 10 John Mathis – DT – (redshirt) Sophomore (6'2, 265); 15 Marcus Brown – DE – Junior (6'5, 245); 17 Mat Freeman – DE – (redshirt) Freshman (6'3, 230); 41 MarQuice Hill – DL – Freshman (6'2, 245); 43 Emiliano Fears – DL – Freshman (6'1, 215); 44 Devin Grant – DL – (redshirt) Sophomore (6'3, 230); 45 Logan Granville – DE – Freshman (6'3, 230); 91 Lloyd Johnson – DT – (redshirt) Freshman (6'2, 280); 92 Jeremiah Robinson – DL – Freshman (6'2, 240); 97 TJ Harold – DT – Freshman (6'1, 290); 99 Josh Gonzalez – DT – (redshirt) Sophomore (6'2, 310)	Linebacker: 11 Tylan Foster – Junior (5'11, 225); 12 Mister Williams – (redshirt) Sophomore (6'0, 245); 22 Derrick Lewis – Junior (6'1, 210); 23 Ricky Rich – (redshirt) Sophomore (6'1, 212); 26 Emmerick Dopona – (redshirt) Freshman (5'10, 215); 32 Darius Sanders – Junior (6'2, 199); 33 Tylan George – Junior (5'11, 212); 42 Caleb Lewis – (redshirt) Junior (6'2, 235); 54 Josh Pastrana – Freshman (6'0, 205); Defensive back: 2 James Tuayemie – CB – (redshirt) Junior (5'11, 205); 3 Mason Chambers – S – (redshirt) Junior (6'0, 210); 4 Chris Pierce – CB – Sophomore (6'0, 170); 5 Tiji Paul – CB – Senior (5'10, 160); 6 Ronald Wilson – S – Junior (5'10, 180); 7 Brandon Richard (C) – S – (redshirt) Senior (5'11, 183); 13 Tre Richardson – S – (redshirt) Senior (6'2, 178); 14 Ethan Alexander – DB – (redshirt) Senior (6'2, 205); 16 Dante Heaggans – S – (redshirt) Senior (6'1, 185); 18 D'Arius Carmouche – CB – Freshman (6'0, 165); 20 Kendrick Stone – DB – (redshirt) Sophomore (6'2, 190); 21 A.J. Harris – S – Freshman (5'10, 170); 24 Barry Dillon – CB – Freshman (6'1, 170); 25 Patrick Batiste – CB – Freshman (6'0, 185); 28 Jayden Staggers – CB – Sophomore (5'11, 167); 31 DeVonte Wilson – S – (redshirt) Sophomore (6'2, 196); 36 Keenon Pitts – CB – (redshirt) Junior (5'10, 169); 40 Khalil Warfield – S – (redshirt) Sophomore (6'2, 193); Kicker/Punter: 24 Mason Lawler – K – (redshirt) Senior (6'3, 220); 37 Ben D'Aquila – P/K – Sophomore (6'0, 200); 46 Brack Peacock – K – Freshman (5'6, 165); 48 Haden Tessier – P/K – (redshirt) Freshman (5'9, 162); Legend: (C) Team captain; (S) Suspended; (I) Ineligible; Injured; Redshirt

== Depth chart ==
Defense

SAM
7 Brandon Richard
32 Darius Sanders

FS
6 Ronald Wilson
20 Kendrick Stone

M	W
23 Ricky Rich	12 Mister Williams
11 Tylan Foster	22 Derrick Lewis

SS
3 Mason Chambers
14 Ethan Alexander

CB
2 James Tuayemie
13 Tre Richardson

DE	DT	DT	DE
1 Ayodele Adeoye -OR- 15 Marcus Brown	8 Chase Carter	9 Darren Brown	0 Steven Parker
33 Tylan George	10 John Mathis	99 Josh Gonzalez -OR- 91 Lloyd Johnson	44 Devin Grant

CB
5 Tiji Paul
4 Chris Pierce

Offense

X
15 Jaelin Campbell
8 Jameson Garcia
-OR-
10 Kailan Noseff

Y
18 Brandon Porter
13 Marquez Perez

LT	LG	C	RG	RT
56 Alex Costilla	63 Stanley Mark	75 Silas Robinson	77 Jayden Borjas	71 Joe Bryson
57 Rasheed Jackson	62 Austin DeArmond	73 Caleb Flores	55 River Gordon	78 Branon Jackson

TE
11 Jackson Lowe
-OR-
27 Dalton Meyer
47 Dane Farley

Z
21 Caleb Chapman
7 Jaelon Travis

QB
1 Zach Calzada
12 Richard Torres
-OR-
6 Ryan Stubblefield

Key reserves
2 CJ Hardy (WR)
3 DeKalon Taylor (WR)
16 Dante Heaggans (DB)

RB
0 Tre Siggers
-OR-
5 Jarrell Wiley
20 Timothy Carter

Special teams
PK 23 Mason Lawler
PK 48 Haden Tessier
P 37 Ben D'Aquila
P 48 Haden Tessier
KR 3 DeKalon Taylor
PR 3 DeKalon Taylor
LS 49 Bryce Felt
H 35 Chance Trentman-Rosas

== Game summaries ==
=== @ UTEP ===
Uniform combination
Helmet	Jersey	Pants

Game One – Incarnate Word Cardinals at UTEP Miners

Quarter	1	2	3	4	Total
No. 7 Cardinals	7	7	0	0	14
Miners	7	7	7	7	28

at Sun Bowl (stadium), El Paso, TX

- Date: September 2
- Game time: 8:00 p.m.
- Game weather: Temperature: 92 • Wind: SW 3 mph • Weather: Sunny
- Game attendance: 30,738
- Referee: Ed Ardito
- TV: ESPN+
- Box Score

Game information

First Quarter

- UIW – 10:46 Brandon Porter 34 yard pass from Zach Calzada, Mason Lawler kick
  UIW 7–0 Drive: 4 plays, 44 yards, 1:24
- UTEP – 6:52 Torrance Burgess Jr. 40 yard run, Buzz Flabiano kick
  Tied 7–7 Drive: 8 plays, 75 yards, 3:54

Second Quarter

- UIW – 10:42 Tre Siggers 5 yard run, Mason Lawler kick
  UIW 14–7 Drive: 7 plays, 92 yards, 2:29
- UTEP – 4:52 Jostein Clarke 13 yard pass from Gavin Hardison, Buzz Flabiano kick
  Tied 14–14 Drive: 10 plays, 78 yards, 5:43

Third Quarter

- UTEP – 6:40 Tyrin Smith 24 yard pass from Gavin Hardison, Buzz Flabiano kick
  UTEP 21–14 Drive: 12 plays, 75 yards, 8:20

Fourth Quarter

- UTEP – 8:47 Mike Franklin 3 yard run, Buzz Flabiano kick
  UTEP 28–14 Drive: 12 plays, 96 yards, 7:08

Statistics	UIW	UTEP
First downs	19	25
Plays–yards	58–308	63–423
Rushes–yards	27–63	50–329
Passing yards	245	94
Passing: comp–att–int	18–31–1	10–13–0
Time of possession	24:28	35:32

Team	Category	Player	Statistics
Incarnate Word	Passing	Zach Calzada	18/31, 245 yards, 1 TD, 1 INT
Incarnate Word	Rushing	Tre Siggers	12 carries, 39 yards, 1 TD
Incarnate Word	Receiving	Brandon Porter	6 receptions, 94 yards, 1 TD
UTEP	Passing	Gavin Hardison	10/13, 94 yards, 2 TD
UTEP	Rushing	Deion Hankins	24 carries, 174 yards
UTEP	Receiving	Tyrin Smith	4 receptions, 49 yards, 1 TD

=== @ Northern Colorado ===
Uniform combination
Helmet	Jersey	Pants

Game Two – Incarnate Word Cardinals at Northern Colorado Bears

Quarter	1	2	3	4	Total
No. 10 Cardinals	7	14	14	7	42
Bears	0	0	0	7	7

at Nottingham Field, Greeley, CO

- Date: September 9
- Game time: 3:00 p.m.
- Game weather: Wind: NE 9 mph • Weather: Sunny
- Game attendance: 3,898
- Referee: Gregg Wilson
- TV announcers (ESPN+): Jason Alveen (play-by-play) and Nick Hager (analyst)
- Box Score

Game information

First Quarter

- UIW – 8:34 Marquez Perez 21 yard pass from Zach Calzada, Mason Lawler kick
  UIW 7–0 Drive: 3 plays, 40 yards, 0:41

Second Quarter

- UIW – 14:24 Caleb Chapman 1 yard pass from Zach Calzada, Mason Lawler kick
  UIW 14–0 Drive: 16 plays, 97 yards, 6:50
- UIW – 1:53 Timothy Carter 16 yard run, Mason Lawler kick
  UIW 21–0 Drive: 7 plays, 89 yards, 1:39

Third Quarter

- UIW – 9:22 Zach Calzada 11 yard run, Mason Lawler kick
  UIW 28–0 Drive: 9 plays, 60 yards, 3:18
- UIW – 5:10 Tre Siggers 11 yard run, Mason Lawler kick
  UIW 35–0 Drive: 6 plays, 67 yards, 2:05

Fourth Quarter

- UIW – 10:04 Caleb Chapman 25 yard pass from Zach Calzada, Mason Lawler kick
  UIW 42–0 Drive: 6 plays, 67 yards, 2:37
- UNC – 6:28 Blake Haggerty 43 yard pass from Hank Gibbs, Hunter Green kick
  UIW 42–7 Drive: 9 plays, 88 yards, 3:36

Statistics	UIW	UNC
First downs	29	14
Plays–yards	82–617	69–261
Rushes–yards	42–235	37–93
Passing yards	382	168
Passing: comp–att–int	29–40–1	15–32–1
Time of possession	31:03	28:57

Team	Category	Player	Statistics
Incarnate Word	Passing	Zach Calzada	23/32, 255 yards, 3 TD, 1 INT
Incarnate Word	Rushing	Timothy Carter	16 carries, 85 yards, 1 TD
Incarnate Word	Receiving	Caleb Chapman	5 receptions, 116 yards, 2 TD
Northern Colorado	Passing	Jacob Sirmon	13/27, 114 yards, 1 INT
Northern Colorado	Rushing	David Afari	14 carries, 43 yards
Northern Colorado	Receiving	Blake Haggerty	4 receptions, 57 yards, 1 TD

=== @ Abilene Christian ===
Uniform combination
Helmet	Jersey	Pants

Game Three – Incarnate Word Cardinals at Abilene Christian Wildcats

Quarter	1	2	3	4	Total
No. 10 Cardinals	0	10	0	17	27
Wildcats	0	10	0	10	20

at Anthony Field at Wildcat Stadium, Abilene, TX

- Date: September 16
- Game time: 7:00 p.m.
- Game weather: Temperature: 82 • Wind: W 2 mph • Weather: Sunny
- Game attendance: 8,280
- Referee: John Kellermeier
- TV announcers (ESPN+): Zach Carlyle (play-by-play), Joseph Chapa (analyst) and Kauy Ostlien (sideline)
- Box Score

Game information

First Quarter

- No scoring plays

Second Quarter

- ACU – 4:16 Jeremiah Dobbins 29 yard run, Kyle Ramsey kick
  ACU 7–0 Drive: 8 plays, 80 yards, 4:41
- UIW – 3:29 Zach Calzada 52 yard run, Mason Lawler kick
  Tied 7–7 Drive: 4 plays, 75 yards, 0:47
- ACU – 0:31 Kyle Ramsey 51 yard field goal
  ACU 10–7 Drive: 5 plays, 39 yards, 1:35
- UIW – 0:00 Mason Lawler 43 yard field goal
  Tied 10–10 Drive: 3 plays, 49 yards, 0:31

Third Quarter

- No scoring plays

Fourth Quarter

- UIW – 14:50 Brandon Porter 23 yard pass from Zach Calzada, Mason Lawler kick
  UIW 17–10 Drive: 5 plays, 64 yards, 1:24
- UIW – 10:06 Zach Calzada 1 yard run, Mason Lawler kick
  UIW 24–10 Drive: 8 plays, 70 yards, 4:20
- ACU – 8:26 Jay'Veon Sunday 1 yard run, Kyle Ramsey kick
  UIW 24–17 Drive: 7 plays, 75 yards, 1:34
- UIW – 5:18 Mason Lawler 27 yard field goal
  UIW 27–17 Drive: 7 plays, 56 yards, 3:01
- ACU – 2:45 Kyle Ramsey 44 yard field goal
  UIW 27–20 Drive: 9 plays, 56 yards, 2:27

Statistics	UIW	ACU
First downs	21	19
Plays–yards	67–517	67–320
Rushes–yards	31–144	35–131
Passing yards	373	189
Passing: comp–att–int	23–36–1	15–32–1
Time of possession	28:01	31:59

Team	Category	Player	Statistics
Incarnate Word	Passing	Zach Calzada	23/36, 373 yards, 1 TD, 1 INT
Incarnate Word	Rushing	Zach Calzada	7 carries, 66 yards, 2 TD
Incarnate Word	Receiving	Brandon Porter	10 receptions, 201 yards, 1 TD
Abilene Christian	Passing	Maverick McIvor	15/32, 189 yards, 1 INT
Abilene Christian	Rushing	Jeremiah Dobbins	21 carries, 106 yards, 1 TD
Abilene Christian	Receiving	Cooper McCasland	4 receptions, 64 yards

=== North American ===
Uniform combination
Helmet	Jersey	Pants

Game Four – North American Stallions at Incarnate Word Cardinals

Quarter	1	2	3	4	Total
Stallions	0	0	0	3	3
No. 9 Cardinals	28	14	14	7	63

at Gayle and Tom Benson Stadium, San Antonio, TX

- Date: September 23
- Game time: 6:00 p.m.
- Game weather: Temperature: 99 • Wind: SE 9 mph • Weather: Sunny
- Game attendance: 2,482
- Referee: Matt Carpenter
- TV: ESPN+
- Box Score

Game information

First Quarter

- UIW – 12:22 CJ Hardy 31 yard pass from Zach Calzada, Mason Lawler kick
  UIW 7–0 Drive: 4 plays, 45 yards, 0:55
- UIW – 11:30 Ronald Wilson 35 yard interception return, Mason Lawler kick
  UIW 14–0
- UIW – 8:36 Zach Calzada 2 yard run, Mason Lawler kick
  UIW 21–0 Drive: 4 plays, 80 yards, 1:14
- UIW – 5:09 Timothy Carter 2 yard run, Mason Lawler kick
  UIW 28–0 Drive: 5 plays, 35 yards, 1:39

Second Quarter

- UIW – 10:23 CJ Hardy 1 yard pass from Zach Calzada, Mason Lawler kick
  UIW 35–0 Drive: 10 plays, 54 yards, 3:06
- UIW – 4:45 Jarrell Wiley 14 yard run, Mason Lawler kick
  UIW 42–0 Drive: 2 plays, 21 yards, 0:23

Third Quarter

- UIW – 9:38 Dekalon Taylor 24 yard pass from Richard Torres, Mason Lawler kick
  UIW 49–0 Drive: 7 plays, 77 yards, 2:13
- UIW – 7:45 Kendrick Stone 43 yard interception return, Mason Lawler kick
  UIW 56–0

Fourth Quarter

- NAU – 8:22 Christobal Salgado 33 yard field goal
  UIW 56–3 Drive: 4 plays, 3 yards, 4:26
- UIW – 3:40 Nick Meehan 1 yard run, Mason Lawler kick
  UIW 63–3 Drive: 11 plays, 70 yards, 4:31

Statistics	NAU	UIW
First downs	3	26
Plays–yards	49–12	64–531
Rushes–yards	25–10	35–250
Passing yards	2	281
Passing: comp–att–int	15–24–2	18–29–0
Time of possession	27:05	20:55

Team	Category	Player	Statistics
North American	Passing	Oscar Ozuna	5/5, 9 yards
North American	Rushing	Xander Armani Williams	3 carries, 17 yards
North American	Receiving	Colbi Clark	5 receptions, 22 yards
Incarnate Word	Passing	Zach Calzada	11/16, 193 yards 2 TD
Incarnate Word	Rushing	Jarrell Wiley	7 carries, 59 yards, 1 TD
Incarnate Word	Receiving	CJ Hardy	4 receptions, 72 yards, 2 TD

=== Southeastern Louisiana ===
Uniform combination
Helmet	Jersey	Pants

Game Five – Southeastern Louisiana Lions at Incarnate Word Cardinals

Quarter	1	2	3	4	Total
Lions	3	3	13	7	26
No. 8 Cardinals	7	17	9	0	33

at Gayle and Tom Benson Stadium, San Antonio, TX

- Date: October 7
- Game time: 4:00 p.m.
- Game weather: Temperature: 76 • Wind: NE 9 mph • Weather: Cloudy
- Game attendance: 1,622
- Referee: Gary Leeper
- TV: ESPN+
- Box Score

Game information

First Quarter

- UIW – 11:32 Mason Chambers 60 yard fumble recovery, Mason Lawler kick
  UIW 7–0
- SLU – 5:32 Riley Callaghan 23 yard field goal
  UIW 7–3 Drive: 14 plays, 70 yards, 6:00

Second Quarter

- UIW – 12:50 Caleb Chapman 8 yard pass from Zach Calzada, Mason Lawler kick
  UIW 14-3 Drive: 5 plays, 89 yards, 2:04
- SLU – 7:54 Riley Callaghan 31 yard field goal
  UIW 14–6 Drive: 10 plays, 61 yards, 4:56
- UIW – 3:57 Brandon Porter 18 yard pass from Zach Calzada, Mason Lawler kick
  UIW 21–6 Drive: 9 plays, 80 yards, 3:51
- UIW – 0:00 Mason Lawler 25 yard field goal
  UIW 24–6 Drive: 10 plays, 46 yards, 3:55

Third Quarter

- SLU – 11:08 Zachary Clement 8 yard run, Riley Callaghan kick
  UIW 24–13 Drive: 1 play, 8 yards, 0:06
- SLU – 5:55 Jaylon Domingeaux 17 yard pass from Eli Sawyer, run failed
  UIW 24–19 Drive: 8 plays, 66 yards, 3:19
- UIW – 5:55 Brandon Richard 75 yard PAT return
  UIW 26–19
- UIW – 0:42 Zach Calzada 4 yard run, Mason Lawler kick
  UIW 33–19 Drive: 12 plays, 89 yards, 5:06

Fourth Quarter

- SLU – 6:18 Bauer Sharp 8 yard pass from Eli Sawyer, Riley Callaghan kick
  UIW 33–26' Drive: 4 plays, 15 yards, 1:19

Statistics	SLU	UIW
First downs	24	22
Plays–yards	80–416	62–371
Rushes–yards	39–145	29–67
Passing yards	271	304
Passing: comp–att–int	24–41–1	23–33–1
Time of possession	34:16	21:53

Team	Category	Player	Statistics
Southeastern Louisiana	Passing	Eli Sawyer	27/40, 271 yards, 2 TD, 1 INT
Southeastern Louisiana	Rushing	Harlan Dixon	13 carries, 55 yards
Southeastern Louisiana	Receiving	Jaylon Domingeaux	4 receptions, 58 yards, 1 TD
Incarnate Word	Passing	Zach Calzada	23/32, 304 yards, 2 TD, 1 INT
Incarnate Word	Rushing	Jarrell Wiley	9 carries, 54 yards
Incarnate Word	Receiving	Brandon Porter	10 receptions, 182 yards, 1 TD

=== Texas A&M–Commerce ===
Uniform combination
Helmet	Jersey	Pants

Game Six – Texas A&M–Commerce Lions at Incarnate Word Cardinals

Quarter	1	2	3	4	Total
Lions	3	0	0	8	11
No. 7 Cardinals	7	7	0	14	28

at Gayle and Tom Benson Stadium, San Antonio, TX

- Date: October 14
- Game time: 4:05 p.m.
- Game weather: Temperature: 81 • Wind: NE 8 mph • Weather: Sunny
- Game attendance: 2,278
- Referee: Matt Beck
- TV: ESPN+
- Box Score

Game information

First Quarter

- TAMUC – 6:24 Emmanuel Adagvon 35 yard field goal
  TAMUC 3–0 Drive: 8 plays, 62 yards, 3:02
- UIW – 0:08 Jarrell Wiley 13 yard pass from Zach Calzada, Mason Lawler kick
  UIW 7–3 Drive: 1 play, 13 yards, 0:05

Second Quarter

- UIW – 1:57 CJ Hardy 31 yard pass from Zach Calzada, Mason Lawler kick
  UIW 14–3 Drive 5 plays, 68 yards, 1:50

Third Quarter

No scoring

Fourth Quarter

- TAMCU – 14:51 Javotrick Dotrey 40 yard interception, Keith Miller III pass
  UIW 14–11
- UIW – 6:55 Ronald Wilson 71 yard interception, Mason Lawler kick
  UIW 21–11
- UIW – 4:40 Jarrell Wiley 14 yard run, Mason Lawler kick
  UIW 28–11 Drive: 2 plays, 27 yards, 0:48

Statistics	TAMUC	UIW
First downs	13	24
Plays–yards	66–213	79–458
Rushes–yards	33–50	37–158
Passing yards	163	300
Passing: comp–att–int	15–33–2	27–42–3
Time of possession	30:06	28:22

Team	Category	Player	Statistics
Texas A&M–Commerce	Passing	Josh Magana	15/33, 163 yards, 2 INT
Texas A&M–Commerce	Rushing	Ra'veion Hargrove	10 carries, 37 yards
Texas A&M–Commerce	Receiving	Jerome Buckner	2 receptions, 48 yards
Incarnate Word	Passing	Zach Calzada	27/42, 300 yards, 2 TD, 3 INT
Incarnate Word	Rushing	Jarrell Wiley	18 carries, 98 yards, 1 TD
Incarnate Word	Receiving	Jaelin Campbell	7 receptions, 89 yards

=== @ McNeese ===
Uniform combination
Helmet	Jersey	Pants

Game Seven – No. 5 Incarnate Word Cardinals at McNeese Cowboys

Quarter	1	2	3	4	Total
No. 5 Cardinals	0	7	7	21	35
Cowboys	7	17	0	0	24

at Cowboy Stadium, Lake Charles, LA

- Date: October 21
- Game time: 7:00 p.m.
- Game weather: Sunny
- Game attendance: 7,415
- Referee: Craig Helser
- TV: ESPN+
- Box Score

Game information

First Quarter

- MCN – 6:19 Joshon Barbie 24 yard run, Garrison Smith kick
  McNeese 7–0 Drive: 6 plays, 67 yards, 3:17

Second Quarter

- MCN – 14:49 Jon McCall 57 yard pass from Ryan Roberts, Garrison Smith kick
  McNeese 14–0 Drive: 10 plays, 90 yards, 4:32
- UIW – 12:10 Isaiah Robinson 1 yard run, Mason Lawler kick
  McNeese 14–7 Drive: 5 plays, 71 yards, 2:33
- MCN – 7:10 Jon McCall 28 yard pass from Ryan Roberts, Garrison Smith kick
  McNeese 21–7 Drive: 5 plays, 84 yards, 2:02
- MCN – 2:12 Garrison Smith 28 yard field goal
  McNeese 24–7 Drive 7 plays, 9 yards, 3:11

Third Quarter

- UIW – 4:10 Brandon Porter 14 yard pass form Richard Torres, Mason Lawler kick
  McNeese 24–14 Drive: 14 plays, 83 yards, 6:07

Fourth Quarter

- UIW – 13:56 Richard Torres 2 yard run, Mason Lawler kick
  McNeese 24–21 Drive: 11 plays, 70 yards, 2:46
- UIW – 5:09 Brandon Porter 36 yard pass from Richard Torres, Mason Lawler kick
  UIW 28–24 Drive: 6 plays, 75 yards, 2:20
- UIW – 0:16 Marquez Perez 20 yard pass from Richard Torres, Mason Lawler kick
  UIW 35–24 Drive: 7 plays, 60 yards, 2:44

Statistics	UIW	MSU
First downs	25	17
Plays–yards	75–514	63–334
Rushes–yards	43–301	33–134
Passing yards	213	200
Passing: comp–att–int	19–32–0	17–30–1
Time of possession	29:23	30:37

Team	Category	Player	Statistics
Incarnate Word	Passing	Richard Torres	11/18, 161 yards, 3 TD
Incarnate Word	Rushing	Timothy Carter	20 carries, 165 yards
Incarnate Word	Receiving	Brandon Porter	6 receptions, 91 yards, 2 TD
McNeese	Passing	Ryan Roberts	17/30, 200 yards, 2 TD, 1 Int
McNeese	Rushing	Joshon Barbie	21 carries, 117 yards, 1 TD
McNeese	Receiving	Jon McCall	5 receptions, 106 yards, 2 TD

=== @ Lamar ===
Uniform combination
Helmet	Jersey	Pants

Game Eight – Incarnate Word Cardinals at Lamar Cardinals

Quarter	1	2	3	4	Total
No. 8 Cardinals (UIW)	7	7	0	3	17
Cardinals (LU)	7	0	0	0	7

at Provost Umphrey Stadium, Beaumont, TX

- Date: October 28
- Game time: 3:00 p.m.
- Game weather: • Wind: SE 10 mph • Weather: Sunny
- Game attendance: 6,593
- Referee: Gary Leeper
- TV: ESPN+
- Box Score

Game information

First Quarter

- UIW – 3:31 Brandon Porter 24 yard pass from Richard Torres, Mason Lawler kick
  UIW 7–0 Drive: 4 plays, 35 yards, 1:43
- LU – 3:19 Sevonne Rhea 75 yard pass from Cameron George, Chris Esqueda kick
  Tied 7–7 Drive: 1 play, 75 yards, 0:12

Second Quarter

- UIW – 14:38 Dalton Meyer 18 yard pass from Richard Torres, Mason Lawler kick
  UIW 14–7 Drive: 9 plays, 76 yards, 3:33

Third Quarter

No scoring

Fourth Quarter

- UIW – 2:01 Mason Lawler 27 yard field goal
  UIW 17–7 Drive: 9 plays, 50 yards, 4:44

Statistics	UIW	LU
First downs	23	11
Plays–yards	77–459	58–248
Rushes–yards	40–152	32–73
Passing yards	307	175
Passing: comp–att–int	24–37–0	12–26–1
Time of possession	33:15	26:45

Team	Category	Player	Statistics
Incarnate Word	Passing	Richard Torres	24/37, 307 yards, 2 TD
Incarnate Word	Rushing	Dekalon Taylor	12 carries, 83 yards
Incarnate Word	Receiving	Brandon Porter	6 receptions, 101 yards, 1 TD
Lamar	Passing	Robert Coleman	11/25, 100 yards, 1 INT
Lamar	Rushing	Khalan Griffin	16 carries, 50 yards
Lamar	Receiving	Sevonne Rhea	6 receptions, 120 yards, 1 TD

=== Nicholls ===
Uniform combination
Helmet	Jersey	Pants

Game Nine – Nicholls Colonels at Incarnate Word Cardinals

Quarter	1	2	3	4	Total
Colonels	0	24	14	7	45
Cardinals	10	3	6	13	32

at Gayle and Tom Benson Stadium, San Antonio, TX

- Date: November 4
- Game time: 3:00 p.m.
- Game weather: Temperature: 79 • Wind: SE 8 mph • Weather: Sunny
- Game attendance: 3,158
- Referee: James Brookhart
- TV: ESPN+
- Box Score

Game information

First Quarter

- UIW – 12:26 Mason Lawler 24 yard field goal
  UIW 3–0 Drive: 7 plays, 61 yards, 2:27
- UIW – 4:26 Brandon Porter 7 yard pass from Zach Calzada, Mason Lawler kick
  UIW 10–0 Drive: 9 plays, 86 yards, 4:11

Second Quarter

- NSU – 12:30 Gavin Lasseigne 23 yard field goal
  UIW 10–3 Drive: 15 plays, 69 yards, 6:56
- NSU – 11:37 Lee Negrotto 19 yard pass from Pat McQuaide, Gavin Lasseigne kick
  Tied 10–10 Drive: 1 play, 19 yards, 0:07
- NSU – 5:10 Collin Guggenheim 5 yard run, Gavin Lasseigne kick
  NSU 17–10 Drive: 10 plays, 69 yards, 4:38
- NSU – 0:25 Collin Guggenheim 6 yard run, Gavin Lasseigne kick
  NSU 24–10 Drive: 8 plays, 90 yards, 2:27
- UIW – 0:00 Mason Lawler 51 yard field goal
  NSU 24–13 Drive: 5 plays, 25 yards, 0:25

Third Quarter

- NSU – 9:54 Devonte Mathews 58 yard fumble recovery, Gavin Lasseigne kick
  NSU 31–13
- NSU – 7:06 Collin Guggenheim 43 yard run, Gavin Lasseigne kick
  NSU 38–13 Drive: 3 plays, 51 yards, 1:21
- UIW – 6:06 Caleb Chapman 6 yard pass from Zach Calzada, 2 point conversion failed
  NSU 38–19 Drive: 9 plays, 76 yards, 0:50

Fourth Quarter

- NSU – 13:43 Collin Guggenheim 3 yard run, Gavin Lasseigne kick
  NSU 45–19 Drive: 10 plays, 68 yards, 5:16
- UIW – 12:00 Caleb Chapman 29 yard pass from Zach Calzada, 2 point conversion failed
  NSU 45–25 Drive: 5 plays, 74 yards, 1:34
- UIW – 9:07 Jaelin Campbell 19 yard pass from Zach Calzada, Mason Lawler kick
  NSU 45–32 Drive: 2 plays, 47 yards, 0:39

Statistics	NSU	UIW
First downs	26	29
Plays–yards	74–439	69–464
Rushes–yards	55–331	16–45
Passing yards	108	419
Passing: comp–att–int	9–19–0	31–53–2
Time of possession	37:02	22:58

Team	Category	Player	Statistics
Nicholls	Passing	Pat McQuaide	9/19, 108 yards, 1 TD
Nicholls	Rushing	Jaylon Spears	23 carries, 160 yards
Nicholls	Receiving	Quincy Brown	5 receptions, 39 yards
Incarnate Word	Passing	Zach Calzada	28/48, 394 yards, 4 TD, 2 INT
Incarnate Word	Rushing	Isaiah Robinson	9 carries, 31 yards
Incarnate Word	Receiving	Brandon Porter	11 receptions, 158 yards, 1 TD

=== Northwestern State ===
Game Ten – Northwestern State Demons at Incarnate Word Cardinals (Cancelled)

Quarter	1	2	3	4	Total
Demons	0	0	0	0	0
No. 16 Cardinals	2	0	0	0	2

at Gayle and Tom Benson Stadium, San Antonio, TX

- Date: November 11
- Game time: Cancelled

=== @ Houston Christian ===
Uniform combination
Helmet	Jersey	Pants

Game Eleven – Incarnate Word Cardinals at Houston Christian Huskies

Quarter	1	2	3	4	Total
No. 20 Cardinals	14	10	7	14	45
Huskies	0	7	3	14	24

at Husky Stadium, Houston, TX

- Date: November 18
- Game time: 2:00 p.m.
- Game weather: Temperature: 74 • Wind: SW • Weather: Sunny
- Game attendance: 1,797
- Referee: Craig Helser
- TV: ESPN+
- Box Score

Game information

First Quarter

- UIW – 9:36 Isaiah Robinson 4 yard run, Mason Lawler kick
  UIW 7–0 Drive: 3 plays, 62 yards, 1:03
- UIW – 1:24 Caleb Chapman 6 yard pass from Zach Calzada, Mason Lawler kick
  UIW 14–0 Drive: 8 plays, 80 yards, 3:37

Second Quarter

- UIW – 7:36 Caleb Chapman 20 yard pass from Zach Calzada, Mason Lawler kick
  UIW 21–0 Drive: 7 plays, 80 yards, 2:49
- HCU – 4:29 Calvin Wiggins 37 yard pass from Colby Suits, Dillon Fedor kick
  UIW 21–7 Drive: 7 plays, 86 yards, 3:03
- UIW – 1:07 Mason Lawler 51 yard field goal
  UIW 24–7 Drive: 10 plays, 41 yards, 3:22

Third Quarter

- HCU – 3:56 Dillon Fedor 27 yard field goal
  UIW 24–10 Drive: 10 plays, 58 yards, 3:26
- UIW – 0:20 CJ Hardy 15 yard pass from Zach Calzada, Mason Lawler kick
  UIW 31–10 Drive: 10 plays, 65 yards, 3:36

Fourth Quarter

- UIW – 14:34 Caleb Chapman 64 yard pass from Zach Calzada, Mason Lawler kick
  UIW 38–10 Drive: 1 play, 64 yards, 0:09
- UIW – 9:08 Jarrell Wiley 2 yard run, Mason Lawler kick
  UIW 45–10 Drive: 7 plays, 61 yards, 3:31
- HCU – 5:08 Colby Suits 4 yard run, Dillon Fedor kick
  UIW 45–17 Drive: 8 plays, 75 yards, 4:00
- HCU – 2:56 Caleb King 8 yard fumble recovery, Dillon Fedor kick
  UIW 45–24

Statistics	UIW	HCU
First downs	25	20
Plays–yards	73–562	67–316
Rushes–yards	35–155	30–114
Passing yards	407	202
Passing: comp–att–int	29–38–0	23–37–2
Time of possession	31:31	28:29

Team	Category	Player	Statistics
Incarnate Word	Passing	Zach Calzada	29/38, 407 yards, 4 TD
Incarnate Word	Rushing	Jarrell Wiley	14 carries, 93 yards, 1 TD
Incarnate Word	Receiving	Caleb Chapman	7 receptions, 170 yards, 3 TD
Houston Christian	Passing	Colby Suits	23/37, 202 yards, 1 TD, 2 INT
Houston Christian	Rushing	Darryle Evans	12 carries, 67 yards
Houston Christian	Receiving	Karl Reynolds	6 receptions, 58 yards

== National and state recognition ==
One Southland Conference team and conference players received national recognition over the course of the season. One of the players, Incarnate Word's Richard Torres, was recognized on October 23 as National freshman player of the week.

=== Weekly awards ===
Weekly honors
Honors	Player	Position	Date Awarded	Ref.
FedEx Ground FCS National Freshman Player of the Week	Richard Torres	QB	October 23, 2023	

=== Dave Campbell's Texas Football post season All-Texas Non-FBS teams ===
Two Cardinals were named as player of the year for their respective positions. Brandon Porter was named Wide Receiver of the Year. Steven Parker was named Defensive Lineman of the Year. In addition, Zack Calzada was named to the 2023 All-Texas Non-FBS Offense team.

== Conference awards and honors ==
Cardinal players received player of the week recognition six times during the season.

=== Weekly awards ===
Weekly honors
Honors	Player	Position	Date Awarded	Ref.
SLC Offensive Player of the Week	Zach Calzada	QB	September 11, 2023	
SLC Offensive Player of the Week	Brandon Porter	WR	September 18, 2023	
SLC Defensive Player of the Week	Tre Richardson	DB	September 18, 2023	
SLC Defensive Player of the Week	Tylan Foster	LB	October 16, 2023	
SLC Offensive Player of the Week	Richard Torres	QB	October 23, 2023	
SLC Offensive Player of the Week	Brandon Porter	WR	October 30, 2023	

=== Player and Coach of the Year Selections ===
Two Incarnate Word players were individual superlative award winners.

2023 Southland Conference Football Individual Superlative Winners

Offensive Player of the Year: Brandon Porter, UIW
Newcomer of the Year: Zach Calzada, UIW

=== Postseason All–Southland Teams ===
The Southland Conference announced the 2023 all-conference football team selections on November 22, 2023. Incarnate Word had a total of 13 players selected.

Offense
1st Team

- Zach Calzada – Quarterback, GR
- Brandon Porter – Wide receiver, GR
- Caleb Chapman – Wide receiver, GR
- Silas Robinson – Offensive lineman, GR
- Stanley Mark – Offensive lineman, GR

2nd Team

- Joe Bryson – Offensive lineman, GR

Defense

1st Team

- Steven Parker – Defensive lineman, JR
- Ayodele Adeoye – Defensive lineman, GR
- Tylan Foster – Linebacker, JR

2nd Team

- Brandon Richard – Defensive back, GR
- Ronald Wilson – Defensive back, JR
- Dekalon Taylor – Kick returner, SO
- Dekalon Taylor – Punt returner, SO

== Rankings ==
Ranking movements Legend: ██ Increase in ranking ██ Decrease in ranking
	Week													
Poll	Pre	1	2	3	4	5	6	7	8	9	10	11	12	Final
STATS FCS	7	10	10	9	9	8	7	5	8	8	16	20	19	22
Coaches	7	10	9	9	8	6	6	5	4	4	10	11	11	14
