= 2023 Houston Christian Huskies football team =

American college football season

2023 Houston Christian Huskies football
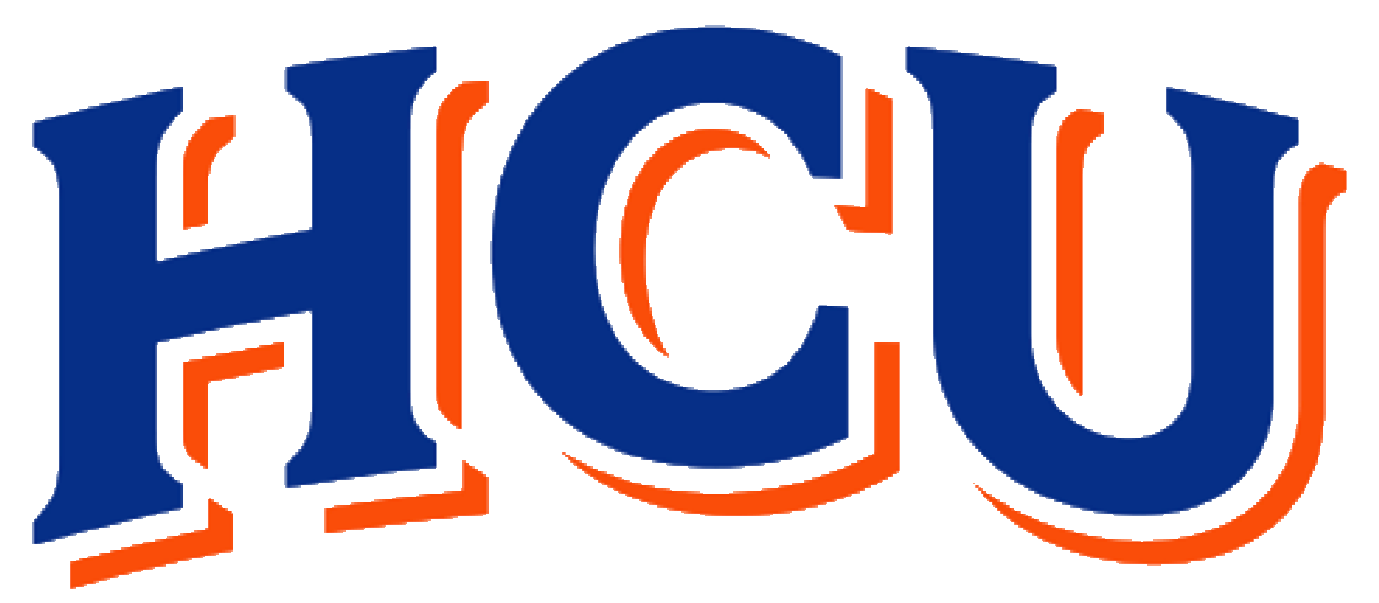
- Conference: Southland Conference
- Record: 5–5 (4–3 (Note: Northwestern State's forfeit against Houston Christian on November 4 counts as a conference win but not an overall win.) Southland)
- Head coach: Braxton Harris (1st season)
- Offensive coordinator: Jason Bachtel (1st season)
- Offensive scheme: Pro spread
- Defensive coordinator: Eric Daniels (1st season)
- Base defense: 3–4
- Home stadium: Husky Stadium

2023 Southland Conference football standings
	Conf.			Overall
Team	W		L	W		L
Nicholls $^	7	–	0	6	–	5
No. 22 Incarnate Word	6	–	1	8	–	2
Lamar	5	–	2	6	–	5
Houston Christian	4	–	3	5	–	5
Southeastern Louisiana	3	–	4	3	–	8
Texas A&M–Commerce *	2	–	5	1	–	9
McNeese	1	–	6	0	–	10
Northwestern State **	0	–	2	0	–	6
$ – Conference champion; ^ – FCS playoff participant; * – Texas A&M–Commerce ineligible for FCS postseason play due to transition from NCAA Division II. ** – Northwestern State canceled its season on October 26.; Rankings from STATS Poll

The 2023 Houston Christian Huskies football team represented Houston Christian University as a member of the Southland Conference during the 2023 NCAA Division I FCS football season. Led by first-year head coach Braxton Harris, the Huskies played their home games at Husky Stadium in Houston. On November 11, the Huskies secured their first winning conference record along with their first non-losing season in program history with a road victory over McNeese State. Led by first-year head coach Braxton Harris, the Huskies compiled an overall record of 5–5. The Huskies finished in fourth place in conference play with a 4–3 record.

== Preseason ==
=== Preseason poll ===
The Southland Conference released their preseason poll on July 24, 2023. The Huskies were picked to finish last in the conference.

=== Preseason All–Southland Teams ===
The Southland Conference announced the 2023 preseason all-conference football team selections on July 21, 2023. HCU had a total of 5 players selected.

Offense

1st Team

- Karl Reynolds – wide receiver, SR

2nd Team

- Christian Hood – offensive lineman, SR

Defense

1st Team

- Jalyx Hunt – defensive lineman, JR
- Rodney Dansby – linebacker, JR
- Devion Hargrove – defensive back, JR

=== Dave Campbell's Texas Football post season All-Texas Non-FBS teams ===
Levi Drake Rodriguez was named to the 2023 All-Texas Non-FBS Defense team.

== Schedule ==
Houston Christian announced their 2023 schedule on December 14, 2022.

Date	Time	Opponent	Site	TV	Result	Attendance
September 2	6:00 p.m.	Arkansas Baptist*	Husky Stadium; Houston, TX	ESPN+	W 66–0	1,763
September 9	6:00 p.m.	at Western Kentucky*	Houchens Industries–L. T. Smith Stadium; Bowling Green, KY	ESPN+	L 22–52	20,712
September 16	6:00 p.m.	at UT Martin*	Graham Stadium; Martin, TN	ESPN+	L 7–66	3,102
September 23	6:00 p.m.	at Southeastern Louisiana	Strawberry Stadium; Hammond, LA	ESPN+	W 34–19	3,694
September 30	6:00 p.m.	Lamar	Husky Stadium; Houston, TX	ESPN+	L 19–21	1,547
October 7	3:00 p.m.	at Nicholls	Manning Field at John L. Guidry Stadium; Thibodaux, LA	ESPN+	L 7–38	5,444
October 14	6:00 p.m.	Prairie View A&M*	Husky Stadium; Houston, TX	ESPN+	W 30–0	2,112
October 28	2:00 p.m.	Texas A&M–Commerce	Husky Stadium; Houston, TX	ESPN+	W 17–13	1,765
November 4	2:00 p.m.	at Northwestern State	Harry Turpin Stadium; Natchitoches, LA	ESPN+	W 2–0 (forfeit)	—
November 11	7:00 p.m.	at McNeese	Cowboy Stadium; Lake Charles, LA	ESPN+	W 35–24	6,724
November 18	2:00 p.m.	No. 20 Incarnate Word	Husky Stadium; Houston, TX	ESPN+	L 24–45	1,797
*Non-conference game; Rankings from STATS Poll released prior to the game; All times are in Central time

== Game summaries ==
=== Arkansas Baptist ===
Arkansas Baptist Buffaloes at Houston Christian Huskies

Quarter	1	2	3	4	Total
Buffaloes	0	0	0	0	0
Huskies	0	0	0	0	0

at Husky Stadium, Houston, Texas

- Date: September 2
- Game time: 6:00 p.m.
- Game attendance: 1,763
- TV: ESPN+

Game information
First quarter

Second quarter Third quarter Fourth quarter

Statistics	ABC	HCU
First downs		
Total yards		
Rushing yards		
Passing yards		
Turnovers		
Time of possession		

Team	Category	Player	Statistics
Arkansas Baptist	Passing		
Arkansas Baptist	Rushing		
Arkansas Baptist	Receiving		
Houston Christian	Passing		
Houston Christian	Rushing		
Houston Christian	Receiving		

=== at Western Kentucky ===
Houston Christian Huskies at Western Kentucky Hilltoppers

Quarter	1	2	3	4	Total
Huskies	0	0	0	0	0
Hilltoppers	0	0	0	0	0

at Houchens Industries–L. T. Smith Stadium, Bowling Green, Kentucky

- Date: September 9
- Game time: 6:00 p.m. CDT
- Game attendance: 20,712
- TV: ESPN+

Statistics	HCU	WKU
First downs		
Total yards		
Rushing yards		
Passing yards		
Turnovers		
Time of possession		

Team	Category	Player	Statistics
Houston Christian	Passing		
Houston Christian	Rushing		
Houston Christian	Receiving		
Western Kentucky	Passing		
Western Kentucky	Rushing		
Western Kentucky	Receiving		

=== at UT Martin ===
Houston Christian Huskies at UT Martin Skyhawks

Quarter	1	2	3	4	Total
Huskies	0	0	0	0	0
Skyhawks	0	0	0	0	0

at Graham Stadium, Martin, Tennessee

- Date: September 16
- Game time: 6:00 p.m. CDT
- Game attendance: 3,102
- TV: ESPN+

Statistics	HCU	UTM
First downs		
Total yards		
Rushing yards		
Passing yards		
Turnovers		
Time of possession		

Team	Category	Player	Statistics
Houston Christian	Passing		
Houston Christian	Rushing		
Houston Christian	Receiving		
UT Martin	Passing		
UT Martin	Rushing		
UT Martin	Receiving		

=== at Southeastern Louisiana ===
Game Four – Southeastern Louisiana Lions (0–3) vs Houston Christian Huskies (1–2)

Quarter	1	2	Total
Huskies			0
Lions			0

at Strawberry Stadium • Hammond, Louisiana

- Date: Saturday, September 23, 2023
- Game time: 6:00 p.m. CDT
- Game attendance: 3,694
- TV: ESPN+

Game information

First quarter
Second quarter
Third quarter
Fourth quarter

Statistics	HCU	SELA
First downs		
Plays–yards		
Rushes–yards		
Passing yards		
Passing: comp–att–int		
Time of possession		

Team	Category	Player	Statistics
Houston Christian	Passing		
Houston Christian	Rushing		
Houston Christian	Receiving		
Southeastern Louisiana	Passing		
Southeastern Louisiana	Rushing		
Southeastern Louisiana	Receiving		

=== Lamar ===
Lamar Cardinals at Houston Christian Huskies

Quarter	1	2	3	4	Total
Cardinals	0	14	0	7	21
Huskies	0	3	3	13	19

at Husky Stadium, Houston, Texas

- Date: September 30
- Game time: 6:00 p.m.
- Game weather: Sunny, 90 °F (32 °C)
- Game attendance: 1,547
- Referee: James Brookhart
- TV: ESPN+
- Box score

Game information
First quarter
- No scoring plays

Second quarter

- HCU – Dillon Fedor 44-yard field goal, 11:57. Huskies 3–0. Drive: 6 plays, 50 yards, 2:13.
- LAM – Major Bowden 41-yard pass from Robert Coleman (Chris Esqueda kick), 9:19. Cardinals 7–3. Drive: 5 plays, 75 yards, 2:38.
- LAM – Andre Dennis 16-yard pass from Robert Coleman (Chris Esqueda kick), 5:48. Cardinals 14–3. Drive: 3 plays, 36 yards, 1:18.

Third quarter

- HCU – Dillon Fedor 22-yard field goal, 4:09. Cardinals 14–6. Drive: 17 plays, 93 yards, 7:31.

Fourth quarter

- LAM – Major Bowden 5-yard run (Chris Esqueda kick), 14:55. Cardinals 21–6. Drive: 8 plays, 75 yards, 4:14.
- HCU – Jesse Valenzuela 12-yard run (Dillon Fedor kick), 7:45. Cardinals 21–13. Drive: 11 plays, 97 yards, 2:58.
- HCU – Jesse Valenzuela 20-yard run (pass failed), 4:31. Cardinals 21–19. Drive: 5 plays, 33 yards, 1:32.

Statistics	LAM	HCU
First downs	22	25
Total yards	412	417
Rushing yards	118	189
Passing yards	294	228
Turnovers	3	1
Time of possession	29:41	30:19

Team	Category	Player	Statistics
Lamar	Passing	Robert Coleman	19/30, 294 yards, 2 TD
Lamar	Rushing	Khalan Griffin	17 rushes, 74 yards
Lamar	Receiving	Izaha Jones	7 receptions, 101 yards
Houston Christian	Passing	Colby Suits	17/35, 228 yards
Houston Christian	Rushing	Darryle Evans	24 rushes, 132 yards
Houston Christian	Receiving	Karl Reynolds	6 receptions, 112 yards

=== at Nicholls ===
Houston Christian Huskies at Nicholls Colonels

Quarter	1	2	3	4	Total
Huskies	7	0	0	0	7
Colonels	7	7	24	0	38

at Manning Field at John L. Guidry Stadium, Thibodaux, Louisiana

- Date: October 7
- Game time: 3:00 p.m. CDT
- Game weather: Sunny
- Game attendance: 5,444
- Referee: Ed Bourgeois
- TV: ESPN+
- Box score

Statistics	HCU	NICH
First downs	14	19
Total yards	220	441
Rushing yards	46	237
Passing yards	174	204
Turnovers	4	1
Time of possession	26:55	33:05

Team	Category	Player	Statistics
Houston Christian	Passing	Colby Suits	17/38, 170 yards, TD, 3 INT
Houston Christian	Rushing	Colby Suits	7 rushes, 18 yards
Houston Christian	Receiving	Ismael Fuller	2 receptions, 35 yards
Nicholls	Passing	Pat McQuaide	15/25, 204 yards, TD, INT
Nicholls	Rushing	Jaylon Spears	8 rushes, 113 yards
Nicholls	Receiving	David Robinson	7 receptions, 127 yards, TD

=== Prairie View A&M ===
Prairie View A&M Panthers at Houston Christian Huskies

Quarter	1	2	3	4	Total
Panthers	0	0	0	0	0
Huskies	0	0	0	0	0

at Husky Stadium, Houston, Texas

- Date: October 14
- Game time: 6:00 p.m.
- Game attendance: 2,112
- TV: ESPN+

Game information
First quarter

Second quarter Third quarter Fourth quarter

Statistics	PVAMU	HCU
First downs		
Total yards		
Rushing yards		
Passing yards		
Turnovers		
Time of possession		

Team	Category	Player	Statistics
Prairie View A&M	Passing		
Prairie View A&M	Rushing		
Prairie View A&M	Receiving		
Houston Christian	Passing		
Houston Christian	Rushing		
Houston Christian	Receiving		

=== Texas A&M–Commerce ===
Texas A&M–Commerce Lions at Houston Christian Huskies

Quarter	1	2	3	4	Total
Lions	0	0	0	0	0
Huskies	0	0	0	0	0

at Husky Stadium, Houston, Texas

- Date: October 28
- Game time: 2:00 p.m.
- Game attendance: 1,765
- TV: ESPN+

Game information
First quarter

Second quarter Third quarter Fourth quarter

Statistics	TAMU-C	HCU
First downs		
Total yards		
Rushing yards		
Passing yards		
Turnovers		
Time of possession		

Team	Category	Player	Statistics
Texas A&M–Commerce	Passing		
Texas A&M–Commerce	Rushing		
Texas A&M–Commerce	Receiving		
Houston Christian	Passing		
Houston Christian	Rushing		
Houston Christian	Receiving		

=== at McNeese ===
Game Ten – Houston Christian Huskies at McNeese Cowboys – Game Summary

Quarter	1	2	3	4	Total
Huskies	0	0	0	0	0
Cowboys	0	0	0	0	0

at Cowboy Stadium, Lake Charles, LA

- Date: November 11
- Game time: 7:00 p.m.
- Game weather: • Wind: mph • Weather:
- TV: ESPN+

Game information

First Quarter

Second Quarter

Third Quarter

Fourth Quarter

Statistics	HCU	McN
First downs		
Plays–yards	–	–
Rushes–yards	–	–
Passing yards		
Passing: comp–att–int	– –	– –
Time of possession	:	:

Team	Category	Player	Statistics
Houston Christian	Passing		00/00; total 0 yds; TDs 0; long 0 yds; sack 0
Houston Christian	Rushing		0 attempts; gain 0 yds; long 0 yds;
Houston Christian	Receiving		0 receptions; 0 total yds; TD 0; long 0 yds
McNeese	Passing		00/00; 0 total yds; Int 0; long 0 s; sack 0
McNeese	Rushing		0 attempts; gained 0 yds; loss 0 yds; long 0;
McNeese	Receiving		0 receptions; 0 yds; long 0 yds; TD 0

=== Incarnate Word ===
Game Eleven – Incarnate Word Cardinals at Houston Christian Huskies

Quarter	1	2	3	4	Total
No. 20 Cardinals	-	-	-	-	0
Huskies	-	-	-	-	0

at Husky Stadium, Houston, TX

- Date: November 18
- Game time: 2:00 p.m.

Game information

First Quarter
Second Quarter
Third Quarter
Fourth Quarter

Statistics	UIW	HCU
First downs		
Plays–yards		
Rushes–yards		
Passing yards		
Passing: comp–att–int		
Time of possession		

Team	Category	Player	Statistics
Incarnate Word	Passing		
Incarnate Word	Rushing		
Incarnate Word	Receiving		
Houston Christian	Passing		
Houston Christian	Rushing		
Houston Christian	Receiving		

== National and state honors ==
Jalyx Hunt was named to Dave Campbell's Texas Football post season 2023 All-Texas Non-FBS Defense team.

== Conference awards and honors ==
=== Weekly awards ===
Huskies were recognized four times as conference players of the week.

Weekly honors
Honors	Player	Position	Date Awarded	Ref.
SLC Offensive Player of the Week	Champ Dozier	RB	September 4, 2023	
SLC Offensive Player of the Week	Colby Suits	QB	September 25, 2023	
SLC Special Teams Player of the Week	Dillon Fedor	K	October 16, 2023	
SLC Defensive Player of the Week	Isaiah Cash	S	October 30, 2023	

=== Player and Coach of the Year Selections ===
Jalyx Hunt was named Southland Conference Defensive player of the year.

=== Postseason All–Southland Teams ===
The Southland Conference announced the 2023 all-conference football team selections on November 22, 2023. Houston Christian had a total of five players selected.

Offense
1st Team

- Karl Reynolds – wide receiver, SR
- Dillon Fedor – place kicker, JR

2nd Team

- Christian Hood – offensive lineman, SR

Defense

1st Team

- Jalyx Hunt – linebacker, SR

2nd Team

- Rodney Dansby – linebacker, JR
