= 2023 McNeese Cowboys football team =

American college football season

2023 McNeese Cowboys football
- Conference: Southland Conference
- Record: 0–10 (1–6 Southland)
- Head coach: Gary Goff (2nd season)
- Offensive coordinator: Adam Neugebauer (1st season)
- Defensive coordinator: Tony Pecoraro (2nd season)
- Home stadium: Cowboy Stadium

2023 Southland Conference football standings
| | Conf. | | | Overall |
| Team | W | | L | W | | L |
|---|---|---|---|---|---|---|
| Nicholls $^ | 7 | – | 0 | 6 | – | 5 |
| No. 22 Incarnate Word | 6 | – | 1 | 8 | – | 2 |
| Lamar | 5 | – | 2 | 6 | – | 5 |
| Houston Christian | 4 | – | 3 | 5 | – | 5 |
| Southeastern Louisiana | 3 | – | 4 | 3 | – | 8 |
| Texas A&M–Commerce * | 2 | – | 5 | 1 | – | 9 |
| McNeese | 1 | – | 6 | 0 | – | 10 |
| Northwestern State ** | 0 | – | 2 | 0 | – | 6 |
$ – Conference champion; ^ – FCS playoff participant; * – Texas A&M–Commerce ineligible for FCS postseason play due to transition from NCAA Division II. ** – Northwestern State canceled its season on October 26.; Rankings from STATS Poll

The 2023 McNeese Cowboys football team represented McNeese State University as a member of the Southland Conference during the 2023 NCAA Division I FCS football season. Led by second-year head coach Gary Goff, the Cowboys played home games at Cowboy Stadium in Lake Charles, Louisiana.

== Preseason ==
=== Preseason poll ===
The Southland Conference released their preseason poll on July 24, 2023. The Cowboys were picked to finish third in the conference.

=== Preseason All–Southland Teams ===
The Southland Conference announced the 2023 preseason all-conference football team selections on July 21, 2023. McNeese had a total of 4 players selected.

Offense

1st Team

- Garrison Smith – placekicker, SO

2nd Team

- Cole LeClair – offensive lineman, JR

Defense

2nd Team

- Welland Williams – defensive lineman, RS-SO
- Javon Davis – defensive back, SO

== Schedule ==
| Date | Time | Opponent | Site | TV | Result | Attendance | Source |
|---|---|---|---|---|---|---|---|
| September 2 | 7:00 p.m. | Tarleton State* | Cowboy Stadium; Lake Charles, LA | ESPN+ | L 34–52 | 12,074 | |
| September 9 | 6:30 p.m. | at Florida* | Ben Hill Griffin Stadium; Gainesville, FL | ESPNU | L 7–49 | 88,163 | |
| September 16 | 6:00 p.m. | at Alcorn State* | Casem-Spinks Stadium; Lorman, MS | | L 3–17 | 2,052 | |
| September 23 | 2:00 p.m. | at Eastern Illinois* | O'Brien Field; Charleston, IL | ESPN+ | L 28–31 | 6,565 | |
| September 30 | 7:00 p.m. | Nicholls | Cowboy Stadium; Lake Charles, LA | ESPN+ | L 10–31 | 9,148 | |
| October 7 | 7:00 p.m. | at Texas A&M–Commerce | Ernest Hawkins Field at Memorial Stadium; Commerce, TX | ESPN+ | L 10–41 | 4,817 | |
| October 21 | 7:00 p.m. | No. 5 Incarnate Word | Cowboy Stadium; Lake Charles, LA | ESPN+ | L 24–35 | 7,415 | |
| October 28 | 7:00 p.m. | Northwestern State^{†} | Cowboy Stadium; Lake Charles, LA (rivalry) | ESPN+ | W 2–0 (forfeit) | | |
| November 4 | 3:00 p.m. | at Southeastern Louisiana | Strawberry Stadium; Hammond, LA | ESPN+ | L 24–38 | 3,228 | |
| November 11 | 7:00 p.m. | Houston Christian | Cowboy Stadium; Lake Charles, LA | ESPN+ | L 24–35 | 6,724 | |
| November 18 | 3:00 p.m. | Lamar | Provost Umphrey Stadium; Beaumont, TX (Battle of the Border) | ESPN+ | L 27–52 | 5,683 | |
*Non-conference game; ^{†}Homecoming; Rankings from STATS Poll released prior to the game; All times are in Central time

== Game summaries ==
=== at Florida (FBS) ===
Previous meeting
First Meeting

Game Two – McNeese Cowboys (0–1) at Florida Gators (FBS) (0–1) – Game summary

| Quarter | 1 | 2 | 3 | 4 | Total |
|---|---|---|---|---|---|
| McNeese | 0 | 0 | 0 | 7 | 7 |
| Florida | 13 | 13 | 16 | 7 | 49 |

at Ben Hill Griffin Stadium • Gainesville, Florida

- Date: September 9
- Game time: 7:35 p.m. EDT
- Game weather: Sunny
- Game attendance: 88,163
- Referee: Wayne Winkler
- TV announcers (ESPNU): Beth Mowins (play-by-play), Kirk Morrison (analyst), and Stormy Buonantony (sideline reporter)
- Boxscore

Game information

First quarter

- (10:59) FLA – Montrell Johnson Jr. 2-yard run (pass failed) (Drive: 9 plays, 62 yards, 3:54; Florida 6-0)
- (0:28) FLA – Graham Mertz 1-yard run (Adam Mihalek kick) (Drive: 11 plays, 99 yards, 5:28; Florida 13-0)

Second quarter

- (7:04) FLA – Treyaun Webb 2-yard run (pass failed) (Drive: 12 plays, 75 yards, 5:15; Florida 19-0)
- (0:34) FLA – Trevor Etienne 8-yard run (Adam Mihalek kick) (Drive: 10 plays, 74 yards, 3:53; Florida 26-0)

Third quarter

- (9:27) FLA – Montrell Johnson Jr. 8-yard run (Adam Mihalek kick) (Drive: 7 plays, 71 yards, 3:57; Florida 33-0)
- (3:45) FLA – Ricky Pearsall 50-yard pass from Graham Mertz (Adam Mihalek kick) (Drive: 5 plays, 84 yards, 2:41; Florida 40-0)
- (2:54) FLA – Jamari Lyons 0-yard safety (Florida 42-0)

Fourth quarter

- (13:00) FLA – Treyaun Webb 5-yard run (Trey Smack kick) (Drive: 9 plays, 62 yards, 4:54; Florida 49-0)
- (2:24) MCN – Coleby Hamm 8-yard run (Garrison Smith kick) (Drive: 1 play, 8 yards, 0:09; Florida 49-7)

| Statistics | MCN | FLA |
|---|---|---|
| First downs | 6 | 33 |
| Total yards | 40–112 | 74–560 |
| Rushing yards | 26–46 | 51–327 |
| Passing yards | 66 | 233 |
| Passing: Comp–Att–Int | 7–14–0 | 18–23–0 |
| Time of possession | 23:51 | 36:09 |

| Team | Category | Player | Statistics |
|---|---|---|---|
| McNeese | Passing | Nate Glantz | 6/13, 62 yards |
| McNeese | Rushing | D'Angelo Durham | 11 carries, 45 yards |
| McNeese | Receiving | Jon McCall | 1 reception, 18 yards |
| Florida | Passing | Graham Mertz | 14/17, 193 yards, TD |
| Florida | Rushing | Montrell Johnson Jr. | 15 carries, 119 yards, 2 TD |
| Florida | Receiving | Ricky Pearsall | 6 receptions, 123 yards, TD |

== Postseason All–Southland Teams ==
The Southland Conference announced the 2023 all-conference football team selections on November 22, 2023. Three McNeese players were selected.

Offense

2nd Team

- Jon McCall – wide receiver, R-SO
- Cole LeClair – offensive line, JR

Defense

1st Team

- Micah Davey – linebacker, R-SO
