= 2023 Nicholls Colonels football team =

American college football season

2023 Nicholls Colonels football

Southland champion

NCAA Division I First Round, L 0–35 at Southern Illinois
- Conference: Southland Conference
- Record: 6–5 (7–0 (Note: Northwestern State's forfeit against Nicholls on October 14 counts as a conference win but not an overall win.) Southland)
- Head coach: Tim Rebowe (9th season)
- Offensive coordinator: Rob Christophel (9th season)
- Offensive scheme: Spread
- Defensive coordinator: Tommy Rybacki (9th season)
- Base defense: Multiple 4–3
- Home stadium: Manning Field at John L. Guidry Stadium

2023 Southland Conference football standings
	Conf.			Overall
Team	W		L	W		L
Nicholls $^	7	–	0	6	–	5
No. 22 Incarnate Word	6	–	1	8	–	2
Lamar	5	–	2	6	–	5
Houston Christian	4	–	3	5	–	5
Southeastern Louisiana	3	–	4	3	–	8
Texas A&M–Commerce *	2	–	5	1	–	9
McNeese	1	–	6	0	–	10
Northwestern State **	0	–	2	0	–	6
$ – Conference champion; ^ – FCS playoff participant; * – Texas A&M–Commerce ineligible for FCS postseason play due to transition from NCAA Division II. ** – Northwestern State canceled its season on October 26.; Rankings from STATS Poll

The 2023 Nicholls Colonels football team represented Nicholls State University as a member of the Southland Conference during the 2023 NCAA Division I FCS football season. The Colonels were led by ninth-year head coach Tim Rebowe and played their home games at Manning Field at John L. Guidry Stadium in Thibodaux, Louisiana.

== Preseason ==
=== Preseason poll ===
The Southland Conference released their preseason poll on July 24, 2023. The Colonels were picked to finish fourth in the conference.

=== Preseason All–Southland Teams ===
The Southland Conference announced the 2023 preseason all-conference football team selections on July 21, 2023. Nicholls had a total of 10 players selected.

Offense

1st Team

- Collin Guggenheim – running back, JR
- Evan Roussel – offensive lineman, SR
- Mark Barthelemy – offensive lineman, SR

2nd Team

- Kylan Dupre – punter, SO

Defense

1st Team

- Perry Ganci – defensive lineman, SR
- Eli Ennis – linebacker, SO
- Jordan Jackson – defensive back, SR
- Tyler Morton – defensive back, JR
- Jaylon Spears – kick returner, RS-SO

2nd Team

- Kylin White – linebacker, RS-SO

== Personnel ==
2023 Nicholls Colonels football team roster
Players
Coaches
Offense

Pos.	#	Name	Class
WR	0	Neno Lemay	So
WR	1	Terry Matthews	Jr
RB	2	Jaylon Spears	So
RB	3	John Carrington III	Sr
RB	4	Marquese Albert	Jr
WR	5	David Robinson Jr.	Sr
QB	7	Pat McQuaide	So
WR	8	Quincy Brown	Jr
TE	9	Lee Negrotto	Jr
QB	11	Ean Rodrigue	Fr
QB	12	Jakob Foss	So
WR	13	Mike Gray Jr.	So
QB	14	Hudson Osborne	Fr
QB	16	Christian Arceneaux	Fr
WR	17	Tank McMath	So
RB	19	Collin Guggenheim	Jr
RB	20	Jake Dalmado	So
WR	23	Jason Barnes Jr.	Fr
WR	25	Gil Chapman	Fr
RB	30	Corey Warren Jr.	So
WR	31	Karaaz Johnson	Fr
RB	32	Jayden Milton	Fr
WR	33	Kyler Paul	Fr
RB	37	Tye Smith-Lindsey	GS
WR	39	Brailon Raymond	Fr
OL	40	Cohen Barrilleaux	Fr
TE	42	Justin Brooks	Fr
TE	43	Nathan Hebb	Jr
TE	47	Darrel Gibson	Fr
TE	48	Scott White	Fr
OL	54	Aaron Ponson	Fr
OL	56	Justin Howard	Fr
OL	58	Jairen Joseph	Fr
OL	59	Ethan Reynolds	Fr
OL	60	Jordan Aaron	Jr
OL	61	Reed Lambert	Jr
OL	62	Seth Trahan	So
OL	63	Hamza Rahman	Fr
OL	65	Christian Mannino	So
OL	66	Sameij Scott	Fr
OL	67	Owen Melville	Jr
OL	68	Robbie Pizzolato	Fr
OL	70	Jacob Johnson	Fr
OL	71	Evan Roussel	Jr
OL	72	Seth Doran	Fr
OL	73	Colby Orgeron	Jr
OL	74	DeAndre’ Keller	So
OL	75	Mark Barthelemy	Sr
OL	76	Ryan Bernard	Fr
OL	77	Cam Banks	Fr
OL	78	Jaden Ben	Jr
OL	79	Cru Blanchard	So
WR	80	Scrappy Osby	Fr
TE	81	Treylin Whaley	Fr
WR	82	Jackson Dufrene	Fr
WR	83	Dany'e Brooks	So
WR	84	Navell Chopin	Jr
WR	85	Christian McNees	Fr
WR	86	Tyren Montgomery	Jr
WR	87	Zhavier Jupiter	Fr
TE	88	Connor Venetis	Jr
TE	89	Logan Wilcox	Jr

Defense

Pos.	#	Name	Class
DB	2	Tyler Morton	Jr
DB	6	Jordan Jackson	Sr
LB	7	Brandon Lairy	Sr
LB	10	Hayden Shaheen	So
LB	11	Quinton Sharkey	Sr
DB	15	Kendarius Smith	Jr
DB	17	Ma’Lyk Smith	Fr
DB	18	Markeyvrick Eddie	Jr
LB	20	Kershawn Fisher	Jr
DB	21	Malik Woodery	So
DB	22	Tyreke Boyd	Jr
DB	23	Matt Melancon	Fr
DB	24	Chancellor Hitchens	Jr
LB	25	Elijah Reames	Sr
DB	26	Keontae Williams	So
DB	27	Maurquel Price	Jr
DB	28	Willie Butler Jr.	So
DB	29	Devonte' Mathews	Jr
DB	30	Elijah Winters	So
DB	33	Shermar Carter	Fr
DB	34	Paxton Martin	So
DB	35	Ethan Lee	So
DB	36	Justin Helper	Fr
DB	37	Hunter Addison	Fr
LB	39	Connor Orgeron	Fr
LB	41	Dominic Logiudice	Fr
LB	44	Eli Ennis	So
DL	45	Alex Villavaso	So
DB	46	Josh Wax	Fr
DB	47	Destin Refuge	So
DL	48	Luke Ydarraga	Fr
LB	49	Jacob Parker	Sr
LB	50	Kaden Henderson	Fr
DL	51	Joe Mason	Jr
LB	52	Andrew Cavalier	Fr
LB	52	Kaiden Jones	So
LB	53	Jake Newchurch	Fr
DL	54	Marcus Dickey	Fr
DL	56	Rasheed Lovelace	Fr
LB	57	Hayden Cormier	Fr
LB	58	Kylin White	So
LB	59	Lance Rockwood Jr.	Jr
LB	60	Aiden Cain	Fr
DL	90	Aidan Clements	Fr
DL	91	Zack Bernard	Jr
DL	92	Josh Johnson	Fr
DL	93	Kolby Coleman	Fr
DL	94	Nick Williams	Fr
DL	95	Dillion Davis	Jr
DL	97	Dane Whalen	Jr
DL	98	Perry Ganci	Sr
DL	99	JaQuan Fank	Fr

Special teams

Pos.	#	Name	Class
K/P	34	Ray Vallee	Jr
K/P	38	Kylan Dupre	So
K/P	40	William Bryant	Fr
K	46	Gavin Lasseigne	Sr
LS	49	Josh Bellanger	Fr
LS	50	Jackson McFarland	So
LS	53	Craig Roth	Fr

Head coach

- Tim Rebowe (LSU)

Coordinators/assistant coaches

- Rob Christophel (Austin Peay State)
  Offensive coordinator/qb
- Tommy Rybacki (Jacksonville State)
  Defensive coordinator
- Toren Joseph (Nicholls State)
  Safeties
- Tylan Martin (Jacksonville State)
  Running backs
- Darion Monroe (Tulane)
  Cornerbacks
- Sean Murphy (Millsaps College)
  Wide receivers
- Brian Wallace (Louisiana College)
  Defensive line
- Andrew Neupert (New Orleans)
  Tight ends
- P.J. Burkhalter (Nicholls State)
  Offensive line

Legend

- (C) Team captain
- (S) Suspended
- (I) Ineligible
- Injured
- Redshirt

Roster

== Schedule ==
Date	Time	Opponent	Site	TV	Result	Attendance
August 31	6:00 p.m.	No. 10 Sacramento State*	Manning Field at John L. Guidry Stadium; Thibodaux, LA	ESPN+	L 24–38	5,134
September 9	7:00 p.m.	at TCU*	Amon G. Carter Stadium; Fort Worth, TX	ESPN+	L 6–41	45,010
September 23	6:00 p.m.	at Tulane*	Yulman Stadium; New Orleans, LA	ESPN+	L 7–36	22,842
September 30	7:00 p.m.	at McNeese	Cowboy Stadium; Lake Charles, LA	ESPN+	W 31–10	9,148
October 7	3:00 p.m.	Houston Christian^{†}	Manning Field at John L. Guidry Stadium; Thibodaux, LA	ESPN+	W 38–7	5,444
October 14	3:00 p.m.	Northwestern State	Manning Field at John L. Guidry Stadium; Thibodaux, LA (NSU Challenge)	ESPN+	W 2–0 (Forfeit)	N/A
October 21	3:30 p.m.	at Texas A&M–Commerce	Ernest Hawkins Field at Memorial Stadium; Commerce, TX	ESPN+	W 27–7	8,248
October 28	2:00 p.m.	Southeast Missouri State*	Manning Field at John L. Guidry Stadium; Thibodaux, LA	ESPN+	L 31–35	5,033
November 4	3:00 p.m.	at No. 8 Incarnate Word	Gayle and Tom Benson Stadium; San Antonio, TX	ESPN+	W 45–32	3,158
November 11	3:00 p.m.	Lamar	Manning Field at John L. Guidry Stadium; Thibodaux, LA	ESPN+	W 37–24	6,845
November 16	6:00 p.m.	at Southeastern Louisiana	Strawberry Stadium; Hammond, LA (River Bell Classic)	ESPN+	W 21–16	5,398
November 25	2:00 p.m.	at No. 14 Southern Illinois*	Saluki Stadium; Carbondale, IL (NCAA Division I First Round)	ESPN+	L 0–35	4,576
*Non-conference game; ^{†}Homecoming; Rankings from STATS Poll released prior to the game; All times are in Central time

== Game summaries ==
=== vs. No. 10 Sacramento State ===
No. 10 Sacramento State Hornets (0–0) at Nicholls Colonels (0–0)

Quarter	1	2	3	4	Total
No. 10 Hornets	7	10	7	14	38
Colonels	0	3	7	14	24

at Manning Field at John L. Guidry Stadium, Thibodaux, LA

- Date: August 31, 2023
- Game time: 6:00 p.m. CST
- Game weather: Sunny
- Game attendance: 5,134
- Referee: James Brookhard
- TV announcers (ESPN+): Jack Benjamin (play-by-play), Wayde Keiser (analysis)

Game information

First Quarter

- (10:01) SAC – Marcus Fulcher 5-yard run, Zach Schreiner kick (Drive: 14 plays, 75 yards, 4:59; Sacramento State 7–0)

Second Quarter

- (13:16) SAC – Marcus Fulcher 1-yard run, Zach Schreiner kick (Drive: 5 plays, 33 yards, 2:04; Sacramento State 14–0)
- (6:34) SAC – Zach Schreiner 23-yard field goal (Drive: 7 plays, 24 yards, 2:46; Sacramento State 17–0)
- (0:21) NIC – Gavin Lasseigne 30-yard field goal (Drive: 12 plays, 74 yards, 3:07; Sacramento State 17–3)

Third Quarter

- (7:16) NIC – Pat McQuaide 4-yard run, Gavin Lasseigne kick (Drive: 3 plays, 12 yards, 1:12; Sacramento State 17–10)
- (1:05) SAC – Jared Gipson 40-yard pass from Kaiden Bennett, Zach Schreiner kick (Drive: 5 plays, 89 yards, 1:58; Sacramento State 24–10)

Fourth Quarter

- (12:43) SAC – Kaiden Bennett 7-yard run, Zach Schreiner kick (Drive: 5 plays, 63 yards, 2:06; Sacramento State 31–10)
- (10:13) SAC – Anderson Grover 6-yard pass from Kaiden Bennett, Zach Schreiner kick (Drive: 1 play, 6 yards, 0:06; Sacramento State 38–10)
- (7:26) NIC – Jaylon Spears 3-yard run, Gavin Lasseigne kick (Drive: 8 plays, 63 yards, 2:06; Sacramento State 38–17)
- (1:40) NIC – Terry Matthews 84-yard pass from Pat McQuaide, Gavin Lasseigne kick (Drive: 3 plays, 96 yards, 1:08; Sacramento State 38–24)

Win Probability

Line

- SAC –23.5

Over/Under

- 54.5

Statistics	SAC	NICH
First downs	22	18
Total yards	441	293
Rushing yards	185	97
Passing yards	256	196
Passing: Comp–Att–Int	16–27–1	15–29–1
Time of possession	33:11	26:49

Team	Category	Player	Statistics
Sacramento State	Passing	Kaiden Bennett	11/16, 221 yards, 2 TD
Sacramento State	Rushing	Marcus Fulcher	19 carries, 71 yards, 2 TD
Sacramento State	Receiving	Devin Gandy	3 receptions, 82 yards
Nicholls	Passing	Pat McQuaide	15/29, 196 yards, TD, INT
Nicholls	Rushing	Collin Guggenheim	16 carries, 74 yards
Nicholls	Receiving	Terry Matthews	1 reception, 84 yards

=== at TCU ===
Nicholls Colonels (0–1) at TCU Horned Frogs (0–1)

Quarter	1	2	3	4	Total
Colonels	0	3	3	0	6
Horned Frogs	14	10	0	17	41

at Amon G. Carter Stadium • Fort Worth, Texas

- Date: September 9th
- Game time: 7:00 p.m. CST
- Game weather: Sunny, 94 °F (34 °C), Wind: NE 12mph
- Game attendance: 45,010
- Referee: Luke Richmond
- TV announcers (ESPN+): Ted Emrich, Taylor McHargue

Game information

First quarter

Second quarter

Third quarter

Fourth quarter

Statistics	Nicholls	TCU
First downs	15	22
Plays–yards	75–263	70–442
Rushes–yards	86	129
Passing yards	177	313
Passing: comp–att–int	17–36–1	28–33–1
Time of possession	35:26	24:34

Team	Category	Player	Statistics
Nicholls	Passing	Pat McQuaide	17/36, 177 yards, 1 INT
Nicholls	Rushing	Collin Guggenheim	14 carries, 38 yards
Nicholls	Receiving	Neno Lemay	8 receptions, 100 yards
TCU	Passing	Chandler Morris	26/30, 263 yards, 2 TD
TCU	Rushing	Emani Bailey	19 carries, 67 yards
TCU	Receiving	Warren Thompson	8 receptions, 92 yards

=== at Tulane ===
Nicholls Colonels (0–2) at Tulane Green Wave (2–1) – Game summary

Quarter	1	2	3	4	Total
Colonels	0	7	0	0	7
Green Wave	17	10	6	3	36

at Yulman Stadium • New Orleans, LA

- Date: September 23, 2023
- Game time: 6:00 p.m. CST
- Game weather: Sunny • Temperature: 86 °F (30 °C) • Wind: SE 5 mph
- Game attendance: 22,842
- Referee: Steven Anderson
- TV announcers (ESPN+): Richard Cross (play-by-play), Taylor McHargue (color)

Game information

First Quarter

- (10:32) TUL – Shi'Keem Laister 27-yard punt return, Valentino Ambrosio kick (Drive: 5 plays, 17 yards, 2:36; Tulane 7–0)
- (1:30) TUL – Valentino Ambrosio 32-yard field goal (Drive: 10 plays, 36 yards, 5:26; Tulane 10–0)
- (0:12) TUL – Lawrence Keys III 40-yard pass from Michael Pratt, Valentino Ambrosio kick (Drive: 1 play, 40 yards, 0:08; Tulane 17–0)

Second Quarter

- (9:08) TUL – Lawrence Keys III 15-yard pass from Michael Pratt, Valentino Ambrosio kick (Drive: 3 plays, 15 yards, 1:52; Tulane 24–0)
- (3:33) NICH – Neno Lemay 13-yard pass from Pat McQuaide, Gavin Lasseigne kick (Drive: 9 plays, 75 yards, 5:35; Tulane 24–7)
- (0:38) TUL – Valentino Ambrosio 45-yard field goal (Drive: 10 plays, 41 yards, 2:50; Tulane 27–7)

Third Quarter

- (4:01) TUL – Michael Pratt 1-yard run, two-point pass conversion attempt failed (Drive: 3 plays, 10 yards, 1:08; Tulane 33–7)

Fourth Quarter

- (6:19) TUL – Valentino Ambrosio 31-yard field goal (Drive: 6 plays, 74 yards, 2:39; Tulane 36–7)

Win Probability

Line

- TUL -38.0

Over/Under

- 55.5

Statistics	NICH	TUL
First downs	21	19
Total yards	335	408
Rushing yards	62	150
Passing yards	273	258
Turnovers	4	3
Time of possession	32:26	27:34

Team	Category	Player	Statistics
Nicholls	Passing	Pat McQuaide	27/39, 273 yards, TD, 4 INTs
Nicholls	Rushing	Collin Guggenheim	14 carries, 56 yards
Nicholls	Receiving	Neno Lemay	8 receptions, 75 yards, TD
Tulane	Passing	Michael Pratt	18/23, 190 yards, 2 TDs, INT
Tulane	Rushing	Arnold Barnes III	4 carries, 71 yards
Tulane	Receiving	Lawrence Keys III	4 receptions, 77 yards, 2 TDs

=== at McNeese ===
Nicholls Colonels (0–4) at McNeese Cowboys (0–3)

Quarter	1	2	3	4	Total
Colonels	7	17	0	7	31
Cowboys	0	7	3	0	10

at Cowboy Stadium, Lake Charles, LA

- Date: September 30, 2023
- Game time: 7:00 p.m. CST
- Game weather: Sunny - Wind: E 10mph - Temp: 86
- Game attendance: 9,148
- Referee: Craig Hesler
- TV: ESPN+
- Box Score

Game information

First Quarter
Second Quarter
Third Quarter
Fourth Quarter

Win Probability

Line

Over/Under

Statistics	NICH	MCN
First downs	24	10
Total yards	66-293	56-295
Rushing yards	41-171	24-131
Passing yards	122	252
Turnovers	1	5
Time of possession	36:10	23:50

Team	Category	Player	Statistics
Nicholls	Passing	Pat McQuaide	14/24-0; 120 yds; TD 1; long 25 yds; sacks 1
Nicholls	Rushing	Collin Guggenheim	22 attempts; gain 103 yds; long 14 yds.
Nicholls	Receiving	Neno Lemay	5 receptions; total 40 yds; long 18; TD 1
McNeese	Passing	Nate Glantz	14/30-2; 199 yds; TD 1; long 39 yds; sacks 2
McNeese	Rushing	D'Angelo Durham	9 attempts; gain 45 yds; long 12 yds.
McNeese	Receiving	Jon McCall	4 receptions; total 87 yds; long 39 yds; TD 1

=== vs. Houston Christian ===
Houston Christian Huskies (2–3) at Nicholls Colonels (1–4)

Quarter	1	2	3	4	Total
Huskies	7	0	0	0	7
Colonels	7	7	24	0	38

at Manning Field at John L. Guidry Stadium, Thibodaux, LA

- Date: October 7, 2023
- Game time: 3:00 p.m. CST
- Game weather: Sunny
- Game attendance: 5,444
- Referee: Ed Bourgeois
- TV: ESPN+
- Box Score

Game information

First Quarter
Second Quarter
Third Quarter
Fourth Quarter

Win Probability

Line

Over/Under

Statistics	HCU	NICH
First downs	14	19
Total yards	69-220	69-441
Rushing yards	27-46	44-237
Passing yards	174	204
Turnovers	4	1
Time of possession	26:55	33:05

Team	Category	Player	Statistics
Houston Christian	Passing	Colby Suits	17/38-1; total 170 yds; long 26 yds; TD 1; INT 3; sack 1
Houston Christian	Rushing	Colby Suits	7 attempts; gain 24 yds; loss 6 yds; long 9 yds
Houston Christian	Receiving	Ismael Fuller	2 receptions; 35 yds; long 22 yds
Nicholls	Passing	Pat McQuaide	15/25-1; total 204 yds; long 63 yds; TD 1; INT 1; sack 2
Nicholls	Rushing	Jaylon Spears	8 attempts; gain 114 yds; loss 1 yds; long 58 yds
Nicholls	Receiving	David Robinson	7 receptions; total 127 yds; long 63 yds; TD 1

=== at Texas A&M–Commerce ===
Nicholls Colonels at Texas A&M–Commerce Lions

Quarter	1	2	3	4	Total
Colonels	7	14	0	6	27
Lions	7	0	0	0	7

at Ernest Hawkins Field at Memorial Stadium, Commerce, TX

- Date: October 21, 2023
- Game time: 3:30 p.m. CST
- Game weather: Sunny - Wind: SW 9mph - Temp: 87
- Game attendance: 8,248
- Referee: Gary Leeper
- TV: ESPN+
- Box Score

Game information

First Quarter
Second Quarter
Third Quarter
Fourth Quarter

Win Probability

Line

Over/Under

Statistics	NICH	TAMC
First downs	22	15
Total yards	57-381	66-309
Rushing yards	31-141	28-78
Passing yards	240	231
Turnovers	1	3
Time of possession	29:40	30:20

Team	Category	Player	Statistics
Nicholls	Passing	Pat McQuaide	16/26-1; total 240 yds; long 59 yds; TD 1; sack 1
Nicholls	Rushing	Collin Guggenheim	16 attempts; gain 78 yds; loss 2 yds; long 15 yds; TD 2
Nicholls	Receiving	Terry Matthews	2 receptions; 62 yds; long 59 yds
Texas A&M–Commerce	Passing	Josh Magana	17/20-0; total 130 yds; long 33 yds; TD 1; sack 1
Texas A&M–Commerce	Rushing	Mitchell McGarry	1 attempt; gain 21 yds; long 21 yds
Texas A&M–Commerce	Receiving	Keith Miller III	2 receptions; 53 yds; long 33 yds; TD 1

=== vs. Southeast Missouri State ===
Southeast Missouri State Redhawks at Nicholls Colonels

Quarter	1	2	3	4	Total
Redhawks	3	10	22	0	35
Colonels	7	14	7	3	31

at Manning Field at John L. Guidry Stadium, Thibodaux, LA

- Date: October 28, 2023
- Game time: 2:00 p.m. CST
- Game weather: Sunny
- Game attendance: 5,033
- Referee: Craig Hesler
- TV: ESPN+
- Box Score

Game information

First Quarter
Second Quarter
Third Quarter
Fourth Quarter

Win Probability

Line

Over/Under

Statistics	SEMO	NICH
First downs	19	23
Total yards	66-349	81-406
Rushing yards	43-210	27-61
Passing yards	139	345
Turnovers	0	2
Time of possession	30:34	29:26

Team	Category	Player	Statistics
Southeast Missouri State	Passing	Patrick Heitert	12/23-0; total 139 yds; long 26 yds; TD 1; sacks 5
Southeast Missouri State	Rushing	Geno Hess	18 attempts; gain 136 yds; loss 8 yds; long 64 yds; TD 1
Southeast Missouri State	Receiving	Ryan Flournoy	4 receptions; total 62 yds; long 29 yds; TD 1
Nicholls	Passing	Pat McQuaide	26/53-1; total 345 yds; long 88 yds; TD 1; INT 1; sacks 1
Nicholls	Rushing	Collin Guggenheim	16 attempts; gain 70 yds; loss 2 yds; long 12 yds; TD 1
Nicholls	Receiving	Jaylon Spears	5 attempts; gain 116; long 88 yds; TD 1

=== at Incarnate Word ===
Nicholls Colonels at Incarnate Word Cardinals

Quarter	1	2	3	4	Total
Colonels	0	24	14	7	45
Cardinals	10	3	6	13	32

at Gayle and Tom Benson Stadium, San Antonio, TX

- Date: November 4, 2023
- Game time: 3:00 p.m. CST
- Game weather: Temperature: 79 • Wind: SE 8 mph • Weather: Sunny
- Game attendance: 3,158
- Referee: James Brookhart
- TV: ESPN+

Game information

First Quarter

- UIW – 12:26 Mason Lawler 24 yard field goal
  UIW 3–0 Drive: 7 plays, 61 yards, 2:27
- UIW – 4:26 Brandon Porter 7 yard pass from Zach Calzada, Mason Lawler kick
  UIW 10–0 Drive: 9 plays, 86 yards, 4:11

Second Quarter

- NSU – 12:30 Gavin Lasseigne 23 yard field goal
  UIW 10–3 Drive: 15 plays, 69 yards, 6:56
- NSU – 11:37 Lee Negrotto 19 yard pass from Pat McQuaide, Gavin Lasseigne kick
  Tied 10–10 Drive: 1 play, 19 yards, 0:07
- NSU – 5:10 Collin Guggenheim 5 yard run, Gavin Lasseigne kick
  NSU 17–10 Drive: 10 plays, 69 yards, 4:38
- NSU – 0:25 Collin Guggenheim 6 yard run, Gavin Lasseigne kick
  NSU 24–10 Drive: 8 plays, 90 yards, 2:27
- UIW – 0:00 Mason Lawler 51 yard field goal
  NSU 24–13 Drive: 5 plays, 25 yards, 0:25

Third Quarter

- NSU – 9:54 Devonte Mathews 58 yard fumble recovery, Gavin Lasseigne kick
  NSU 31–13
- NSU – 7:06 Collin Guggenheim 43 yard run, Gavin Lasseigne kick
  NSU 38–13 Drive: 3 plays, 51 yards, 1:21
- UIW – 6:06 Caleb Chapman 6 yard pass from Zach Calzada, 2 point conversion failed
  NSU 38–19 Drive: 9 plays, 76 yards, 0:50

Fourth Quarter

- NSU – 13:43 Collin Guggenheim 3 yard run, Gavin Lasseigne kick
  NSU 45–19 Drive: 10 plays, 68 yards, 5:16
- UIW – 12:00 Caleb Chapman 29 yard pass from Zach Calzada, 2 point conversion failed
  NSU 45–25 Drive: 5 plays, 74 yards, 1:34
- UIW – 9:07 Jaelin Campbell 19 yard pass from Zach Calzada, Mason Lawler kick
  NSU 45–32 Drive: 2 plays, 47 yards, 0:39

Win Probability

Line

Over/Under

Statistics	NICH	UIW
First downs	26	29
Total yards	74	69
Rushing yards	331	45
Passing yards	108	419
Passing: Comp–Att–Int	9–19–0	31–53–2
Time of possession	37:02	22:58

Team	Category	Player	Statistics
Nicholls	Passing	Pat McQuaide	9/19, 108 yards, 1 TD
Nicholls	Rushing	Jaylon Spears	23 carries, 160 yards
Nicholls	Receiving	Quincy Brown	5 receptions, 39 yards
Incarnate Word	Passing	Zach Calzada	28/48, 394 yards, 4 TD, 2 INT
Incarnate Word	Rushing	Isaiah Robinson	9 carries, 31 yards
Incarnate Word	Receiving	Brandon Porter	11 receptions, 158 yards, 1 TD

=== vs. Lamar ===
Lamar Cardinals at Nicholls Colonels

Quarter	1	2	3	4	Total
Cardinals	7	4	7	6	24
Colonels	7	13	14	3	37

at Manning Field at John L. Guidry Stadium, Thibodaux, LA

- Date: November 11, 2023
- Game time: 3:00 p.m. CST
- Game weather: Weather: Cloudy
- Game attendance: 6,845
- Referee: Gary Leeper
- TV: ESPN+
- Box Score

Game information

First Quarter

- LU - 9:12 - Carver, RJ 1 yd run (Esqueda, Chris kick) (Drive: 11 plays, 76 yards, TOP 05:41) LU 7-0
- NIC - 5:00 - Spears, Jaylon 29 yd pass from McQuaide, Pat (Lasseigne, Gavin kick) (Drive: 8 plays, 68 yards, TOP 04:06) LU 7-7

Second Quarter

- NIC - 13:09 - McQuaide, Pat 3 yd pass from McQuaide, Pat ( kick) (Drive: 9 plays, 51 yards, TOP 04:35) NIC 7-13
- LU - 13:09 - Stevens, Ramond 95 yd PAT return NIC 9-13
- NIC - 10:48 - Spears, Jaylon 69 yd run (Lasseigne, Gavin kick) (Drive: 4 plays, 86 yards, TOP 01:21) NIC 7-20
- LU - 4:07 - Maloles, Royce 0 yd safety NIC 11-20

Third Quarter

- LU - 7:45 - Fuselier, Kyndon 19 yd pass from Coleman, Robert (Esqueda, Chris kick) (Drive: 6 plays, 69 yards, TOP 02:38) NIC 18-20
- NIC - 6:29 - Robinson, David 15 yd pass from McQuaide, Pat (Lasseigne, Gavin kick) (Drive: 3 plays, 90 yards, TOP 01:09) NIC 18-27
- NIC - 3:05 - Spears, Jaylon 14 yd run (Lasseigne, Gavin kick) (Drive: 6 plays, 38 yards, TOP 03:07) NIC 18-34

Fourth Quarter

- LU - 14:54 - Gibbs, Devyn 14 yd pass from Coleman, Robert ( ) (Drive: 8 plays, 90 yards, TOP 03:02) NIC 24-34
- NIC - 8:35 - Lasseigne, Gavin 28 yd field goal (Drive: 10 plays, 57 yards, TOP 06:10) NIC 24-37

Statistics

Statistics	Lamar	Nicholls
First downs	18	24
Total yards	416	455
Rushing yards	127	349
Passing yards	289	106
Turnovers	3	0
Time of possession	26:14	33:46

Team	Category	Player	Statistics
Lamar	Passing	Robert Coleman	17/35; 289 total yds; TDs 2; INT 2; long 38 yds; sack 3
Lamar	Rushing	Robert Coleman	14 attempts; gained 93 yds; lost 21 yds; long 28 yds
Lamar	Receiving	Kyndon Fuselier	3 receptions; 77 yds; TD 1; long 34 yds
Nicholls	Passing	Pat McQuaide	9/17; 106 yds; TD 3; long 40 yds
Nicholls	Rushing	Jaylon Spears	16 attempts; gained 177 yds; TDs 2; long 69 yds
Nicholls	Receiving	Lee Negrotto	1 reception; 40 yds;

=== at Southeastern Louisiana ===
Nicholls Colonels at Southeastern Louisiana Lions

Quarter	1	2	3	4	Total
Colonels	0	14	7	0	21
Lions	7	6	3	0	16

at Strawberry Stadium, Hammond, LA

- Date: November 16, 2023
- Game time: 6:00 p.m. CST
- Game weather: Wind: NE 0 mph - Weather: Cloudy - Temp: 66
- Game attendance: 5,398
- Referee: Ed Bourgeois
- TV: ESPN+
- Box Score

Game information

First Quarter

- SLU – 09:49: Dumas, Justin 6 yd run (Callaghan, Riley kick)
  SLU 0–7 8 plays, 47 yards, TOP 03:10

Second Quarter

- NIC – 14:28: McQuaide, Pat 3 yd run (Lasseigne, Gavin kick)
  TIED 7–7 12 plays, 69 yards, TOP 05:21
- NIC – 08:17: Robinson, David 78 yd pass from McQuaide, Pat (Lasseigne, Gavin kick)
  NIC 14–7 4 plays, 91 yards, TOP 02:47
- SLU – 02:53: Callaghan, Riley 31 yd field goal
  NIC 14–10 11 plays, 64 yards, TOP 05:19
- SLU – 00:10: Callaghan, Riley 26 yd field goal
  NIC 14–13 9 plays, 50 yards, TOP 01:31

Third Quarter

- NIC – 11:40: Spears, Jaylon 73 yd pass from McQuaide, Pat (Lasseigne, Gavin kick)
  NIC 21–13 5 plays, 85 yards, TOP 02:43
- SLU – 01:15: Callaghan, Riley 36 yd field goal
  NIC 21–16 5 plays, 27 yards, TOP 02:23

Fourth Quarter

Win Probability

Line

Over/Under

Statistics	NICH	SELA
First downs	16	18
Total yards	59-392	65-218
Rushing yards	33-89	37-113
Passing yards	303	105
Turnovers	2	0
Time of possession	30:59	29:01

Team	Category	Player	Statistics
Nicholls	Passing	Pat McQuaide	20/25-1; 300 yds; 78 yds long; TDs 2; INT 1; sacks 2
Nicholls	Rushing	Jaylon Spears	14 attempts; 65 yds gain; 7 yds loss; 28 yds long;
Nicholls	Receiving	David Robinson	4 receptions; 91 yds; 78 yds long; TD 1;
Southeastern Louisiana	Passing	Zachary Clement	12/25; 98 yds; 23 yds long
Southeastern Louisiana	Rushing	Rodeo Graham, Jr.	11 attempts; 58 yds gain; 15 yds long;
Southeastern Louisiana	Receiving	Xavier Hill	3 receptions; 52 yds; 23 yds long

== FCS Playoffs ==
=== at Southern Illinois ===
Nicholls Colonels at Southern Illinois Salukis

Quarter	1	2	3	4	Total
Colonels	0	0	0	0	0
Salukis	21	0	14	0	35

at Saluki Stadium, Carbondale, IL

- Date: November 25, 2023
- Game time: 2:00 p.m. CST
- Game weather: Weather: Sunny - Temp: 44
- Game attendance: 4,576
- Referee: Brian Holland
- TV: ESPN+
- Box Score

Game information

First Quarter

- SIU – 12:03: Elliot, Rowe 3 yd run (Baumgarte, Jake kick)
  SIU 0–7 9 plays, 74 yards, TOP 02:51
- SIU – 08:28: Strong, Justin 1 yd run (Baumgarte, Jake kick)
  SIU 0–14 5 plays, 35 yards, TOP 02:18
- SIU – 00:59: Quinn, Aidan 14 yd pass from Baker, Nic (Baumgarte, Jake kick)
  SIU 0–21 7 plays, 80 yards, TOP 02:08

Second Quarter
Third Quarter

- SIU – 12:10: Elliot, Ro 60 yd run (Baumgarte, Jake kick)
  SIU 0–28 1 play, 60 yards, TOP 00:11
- SIU – 06:09: Davis III, Vinson 7 yard pass from Baker, Nic (Baumgarte, Jake kick)
  SIU 0–35 7 plays, 39 yards, TOP 03:53

Fourth Quarter

Win Probability

Line

Over/Under

Statistics	NICH	SIU
First downs	12	23
Total yards	62-252	63-358
Rushing yards	33-75	37-177
Passing yards	177	181
Turnovers	3	0
Time of possession	28:50	31:10

Team	Category	Player	Statistics
Nicholls	Passing	Pat McQuaide	12/26; 127 yds; 41 yd long; INT 2
Nicholls	Rushing	Jaylon Spears	10 attempts; 44 yds gain; 8 yds long
Nicholls	Receiving	David Robinson Jr.	5 receptions; 65 yds; 24 yd long
Southern Illinois	Passing	Nic Baker	12/22; 168 yds; 27 yds long; TDs 2
Southern Illinois	Rushing	Ro Elliott	9 attempts; 111 yds; TDs 2; 60 yds Long
Southern Illinois	Receiving	D'Ante' Cox	3 receptions; 63 yds; 27 yds Long

== National recognition ==
The Nicholls football team was recognized as the FedEx Ground FCS team of the week on November 6.

== Conference awards and honors ==
=== Weekly awards ===
Nicholls players were recognized nine times as conference players of the week.

Weekly honors
Honors	Player	Position	Date Awarded	Ref.
SLC Special Teams Player of the Week	Gavin Lasseigne	K	September 11, 2023	
SLC Defensive Player of the Week	Tyler Morton	S	October 2, 2023	
Special Teams Player of the Week	Kylan Dupre	P	October 2, 2023	
Offensive Player of the Week	Collin Guggenheim	RB	October 9, 2023	
Defensive Player of the Week	Tyler Morton	S	October 9, 2023	
Offensive Player of the Week	Collin Guggenheim	RB	November 6, 2023	
Defensive Player of the Week	Devonté Mathews	S	November 6, 2023	
SLC Offensive Player of the Week	Jaylon Spears	RB	November 13, 2023	
SLC Offensive Player of the Week	Pat McQuaide	QB	November 20, 2023	

=== Player and Coach of the Year Selections ===
Nicholls head coach, Tim Rebowe, was named Southland Conference coach of the year. In addition, several Nicholls players were named players of the year.

2023 Southland Conference Football Individual Superlative Winners

Player of the Year: Jaylon Spears, Nicholls
Freshman of the Year: Rasheed Lovelace, Nicholls
Offensive Lineman of the Year: Mark Barthelemy, Nicholls
Coach of the Year: Tim Rebowe, Nicholls

=== Postseason All–Southland Teams ===
The Southland Conference announced the 2023 all-conference football team selections on November 22, 2023. Nicholls had a total of 16 players selected.

Offense
1st Team

- Jaylon Spears – running back, R-SO
- Collin Guggenheim – running back, JR
- Mark Barthelemy – offensive lineman, SR
- Evan Roussel – offensive lineman, JR

2nd Team

- Pat McQuaide – quarterback, SO
- Lee Negrotto – tight end, JR
- David Robinson Jr. – wide receiver, R-JR
- Gavin Lasseigne – place kicker, SR
- Kylan Dupre – punter, SO

Defense

1st Team

- Tyler Morton – defensive back, JR
- Kendarius Smith – defensive back, JR

2nd Team

- Rasheed Lovelace – defensive lineman, R-FR
- Kershawn Fisher – defensive lineman, JR
- Perry Ganci – defensive lineman, SR
- Hayden Shaheen – linebacker, R-SO
- Jordan Jackson – defensive back, SR
