= 2023 Texas A&M–Commerce Lions football team =

American college football season

2023 Texas A&M–Commerce Lions football
- Conference: Southland Conference
- Record: 1–9 (2–5 Southland)
- Head coach: Clint Dolezel (1st season)
- Offensive coordinator: Bobby Bounds (1st season)
- Offensive scheme: Multiple
- Defensive coordinator: Kyle Williams (2nd season)
- Base defense: 4–2–5
- Home stadium: Ernest Hawkins Field at Memorial Stadium

2023 Southland Conference football standings
	Conf.			Overall
Team	W		L	W		L
Nicholls $^	7	–	0	6	–	5
No. 22 Incarnate Word	6	–	1	8	–	2
Lamar	5	–	2	6	–	5
Houston Christian	4	–	3	5	–	5
Southeastern Louisiana	3	–	4	3	–	8
Texas A&M–Commerce *	2	–	5	1	–	9
McNeese	1	–	6	0	–	10
Northwestern State **	0	–	2	0	–	6
$ – Conference champion; ^ – FCS playoff participant; * – Texas A&M–Commerce ineligible for FCS postseason play due to transition from NCAA Division II. ** – Northwestern State canceled its season on October 26.; Rankings from STATS Poll

The 2023 Texas A&M–Commerce Lions football team represented Texas A&M University–Commerce as a member of the Southland Conference during the 2023 NCAA Division I FCS football season. The Lions were led by first-year head coach Clint Dolezel and played home games at the Ernest Hawkins Field at Memorial Stadium in Commerce, Texas.

== Preseason ==
=== Preseason poll ===
The Southland Conference released their preseason poll on July 24, 2023. The Lions were picked to finish sixth in the conference.

=== Preseason All–Southland Teams ===
The Southland Conference announced the 2023 preseason all-conference football team selections on July 21, 2023. TAMUC had a total of 4 players selected.

Defense

2nd Team

- Leon Young – defensive lineman, JR
- Max Epps – defensive back, JR
- Daryion Taylor – defensive back, SR
- Sean Krystoff-King – kick returner, SO

== Schedule ==
Texas A&M–Commerce and the Southland Conference announced the 2023 football schedule on December 14, 2022.

Date	Time	Opponent	Site	TV	Result	Attendance	Source
August 31	7:00 p.m.	No. 16 UC Davis*	Ernest Hawkins Field at Memorial Stadium; Commerce, TX	ESPN+	L 10–48	4,227	
September 9	9:00 p.m.	at No. 9 Sacramento State*	Hornet Stadium; Sacramento, CA	ESPN+	L 6–34	12,316	
September 23	2:30 p.m.	at Old Dominion*	S.B. Ballard Stadium; Norfolk, VA	ESPN+	L 9–10	16,938	
September 30	6:00 p.m.	at Stephen F. Austin*	Homer Bryce Stadium; Nacogdoches, TX	ESPN+	L 27–56	7,029	
October 7	7:00 p.m.	McNeese	Ernest Hawkins Field at Memorial Stadium; Commerce, TX	ESPN+	W 41–10	4,817	
October 14	4:00 p.m.	at No. 7 Incarnate Word	Gayle and Tom Benson Stadium; San Antonio, TX	ESPN+	L 11–28	2,278	
October 21	3:30 p.m.	Nicholls^{†}	Ernest Hawkins Field at Memorial Stadium; Commerce, TX	ESPN+	L 7–27	8,248	
October 28	2:00 p.m.	at Houston Christian	Husky Stadium; Houston, TX	ESPN+	L 13–17	1,765	
November 4	3:00 p.m.	at Lamar	Provost Umphrey Stadium; Beaumont, TX	ESPN+	L 21–41	6,123	
November 11	3:30 p.m.	Southeastern Louisiana	Ernest Hawkins Field at Memorial Stadium; Commerce, TX	ESPN+	L 14–52	4,387	
November 18	2:00 p.m.	at Northwestern State	Harry Turpin Stadium; Natchitoches, LA	ESPN+	W 2–0 (forfeit)		
*Non-conference game; ^{†}Homecoming; Rankings from STATS Poll released prior to the game; All times are in Central time

== Game summaries ==
=== at Sacramento State ===
Texas A&M–Commerce Lions at No. 9 Sacramento State Hornets – Game summary

Quarter	1	2	3	4	Total
Lions	0	6	0	0	6
No. 9 Hornets	10	17	7	0	34

at Hornet Stadium, Sacramento, California

- Date: September 9
- Game time: 9:00 p.m. CDT/7:00 p.m. PDT
- Game weather: Sunny, 85 °F (29 °C)
- Game attendance: 12,316
- Referee: Scott Root
- TV announcers (KMAX-TV/ESPN+): Jason Ross and Darren Arbet

Game information

First Quarter

- (10:01) SAC – Kaiden Bennett 8-yard run (Zach Schreiner kick) (Drive: 7 plays, 80 yards, 2:45; Sacramento State 7–0)
- (4:13) SAC – Zach Schreiner 33-yard field goal (Drive: 10 plays, 42 yards, 3:50; Sacramento State 10–0)

Second Quarter

- (11:16) SAC – Chris Miller 16-yard pass from Kaiden Bennett (Zach Schreiner kick) (Drive: 13 plays, 85 yards, 5:51; Sacramento State 17–0)
- (7:17) SAC – Kaiden Bennett 40-yard run (Zach Schreiner kick) (Drive: 5 plays, 83 yards, 1:53; Sacramento State 24–0)
- (0:41) TAMC – Peter Parrish 1-yard run (Drive: 3 plays, 14 yards, 0:25; Sacramento State 24–6)
- (0:00) SAC – Zach Schreiner 40-yard field goal (Drive: 4 plays, 48 yards, 0:36; Sacramento State 27–6)

Third Quarter

- (8:47) SAC – Marcus Fulcher 5-yard run (Zach Schreiner kick) (Drive: 9 plays, 55 yards, 3:59; Sacramento State 34–6)

Statistics	TAMC	SAC
First downs	13	28
Total yards	216	503
Rushing yards	144	311
Passing yards	72	192
Passing: Comp–Att–Int	13–27–1	17–26–1
Time of possession	29:08	30:52

Team	Category	Player	Statistics
Texas A&M–Commerce	Passing	Peter Parrish	12/25, 63 yards, INT
Texas A&M–Commerce	Rushing	Reggie Branch	14 carries, 65 yards
Texas A&M–Commerce	Receiving	Micaelous Elder	6 receptions, 33 yards
Sacramento State	Passing	Kaiden Bennett	14/22, 176 yards, TD, INT
Sacramento State	Rushing	Kaiden Bennett	10 carries, 101 yards, 2 TD
Sacramento State	Receiving	Coleman Kuntz	4 receptions, 68 yards

=== McNeese ===
McNeese Cowboys at Texas A&M–Commerce Lions

Quarter	1	2	3	4	Total
Cowboys	3	0	0	7	10
Lions	0	14	27	0	41

at Ernest Hawkins Field at Memorial Stadium, Commerce, TX

- Date: October 7
- Game time: 7:00 p.m.
- Game weather: • Wind: N4 mph • Weather: Clear Temp: 64
- Game attendance: 4,817
- Referee: James Brookhart
- TV: ESPN+

Game information

First Quarter

Second Quarter

Third Quarter

Fourth Quarter

Statistics	McN	TAMU–C
First downs	16	18
Plays–yards	68–280	61–470
Rushes–yards	31–64	35–158
Passing yards	216	312
Passing: comp–att–int	22–37–1	15–26–1
Time of possession	28:35	31:25

Team	Category	Player	Statistics
McNeese	Passing	Nate Glantz	10/18, 111 yards, INT
McNeese	Rushing	D'Angelo Durham	13 rushes, 67 yards
McNeese	Receiving	Mahki Paris	4 receptions, 61 yards
Texas A&M–Commerce	Passing	Josh Magana	12/21, 266 yards, 2 TD, INT
Texas A&M–Commerce	Rushing	Ra'veion Hargrove	13 rushes, 96 yards, 2 TD
Texas A&M–Commerce	Receiving	Jabari Khepera	1 reception, 74 yards, TD

=== at Incarnate Word ===
Texas A&M–Commerce Lions at Incarnate Word Cardinals – Game summary

Quarter	1	2	3	4	Total
Lions	3	0	0	8	11
No. 7 Cardinals	7	7	0	14	28

at Gayle and Tom Benson Stadium, San Antonio, Texas

- Date: October 14
- Game time: 4:05 p.m. CDT
- Game weather: Sunny, 81 °F (27 °C)
- Game attendance: 2,278
- Referee: Matt Beck
- TV: ESPN+
- Box Score

Game information

First Quarter

- TAMUC – 6:24 Emmanuel Adagvon 35 yard field goal
  TAMUC 3–0 Drive: 8 plays, 62 yards, 3:02
- UIW – 0:08 Jarrell Wiley 13 yard pass from Zach Calzada, Mason Lawler kick
  UIW 7–3 Drive: 1 play, 13 yards, 0:05

Second Quarter

- UIW – 1:57 CJ Hardy 31 yard pass from Zach Calzada, Mason Lawler kick
  UIW 14–3 Drive 5 plays, 68 yards, 1:50

Third Quarter

No scoring

Fourth Quarter

- TAMCU – 14:51 Javotrick Dotrey 40 yard interception, Keith Miller III pass
  UIW 14–11
- UIW – 6:55 Ronald Wilson 71 yard interception, Mason Lawler kick
  UIW 21–11
- UIW – 4:40 Jarrell Wiley 14 yard run, Mason Lawler kick
  UIW 28–11 Drive: 2 plays, 27 yards, 0:48

Statistics	TAMUC	UIW
First downs	13	24
Plays–yards	66–213	79–458
Rushes–yards	33–50	37–158
Passing yards	163	300
Passing: comp–att–int	15–33–2	27–42–3
Time of possession	30:06	28:22

Team	Category	Player	Statistics
Texas A&M–Commerce	Passing	Josh Magana	15/33, 163 yards, 2 INT
Texas A&M–Commerce	Rushing	Ra'veion Hargrove	10 carries, 37 yards
Texas A&M–Commerce	Receiving	Jerome Buckner	2 receptions, 48 yards
Incarnate Word	Passing	Zach Calzada	27/42, 300 yards, 2 TD, 3 INT
Incarnate Word	Rushing	Jarrell Wiley	18 carries, 98 yards, 1 TD
Incarnate Word	Receiving	Jaelin Campbell	7 receptions, 89 yards

=== at Lamar ===
Texas A&M–Commerce Lions at Lamar Cardinals – Game summary

Quarter	1	2	3	4	Total
Lions	0	7	0	14	21
Cardinals	7	14	7	13	41

at Provost Umphrey Stadium, Beaumont, Texas

- Date: November 4
- Game time: 3:00 p.m. CDT
- Game weather: Sunny, 82 °F (28 °C)
- Game attendance: 6,123
- Referee: Matt Beck
- TV: ESPN+
- Box Score

Statistics	TAMC	LAM
First downs	19	16
Total yards	300	342
Rushing yards	102	246
Passing yards	198	96
Turnovers	4	1
Time of possession	27:37	32:23

Team	Category	Player	Statistics
Texas A&M–Commerce	Passing	Mirko Martos	9/16, 102 yards, TD
Texas A&M–Commerce	Rushing	Shamenski Rucker	12 rushes, 36 yards
Texas A&M–Commerce	Receiving	Austin Samaha	4 receptions, 65 yards
Lamar	Passing	Robert Coleman	8/14, 96 yards, 2 TD, INT
Lamar	Rushing	Khalan Griffin	19 rushes, 113 yards, TD
Lamar	Receiving	Andre Dennis	5 receptions, 43 yards

== National and state recognition ==
Three Southland Conference players and one team were nationally recognized during the season. Texas A&M–Commerce's Max Epps was recognized on September 25 as National defensive player of the week.

=== Weekly awards ===
One Southland Conference team and conference players received national recognition over the course of the season. One of the players, Texas A&M–Commerce's Max Epps, was recognized on September 25 as National defensive player of the week.

Weekly honors
Honors	Player	Position	Date Awarded	Ref.
FedEx Ground National Defensive Player of the Week	Max Epps	DB	September 25, 2023	

=== Dave Campbell's Texas Football post season All-Texas Non-FBS teams ===
Levi Drake Rodriguez was named to the 2023 All-Texas Non-FBS Defense team.

== Conference awards and honors ==
=== Weekly awards ===
One Lion received conference player of the week recognition.

Weekly honors
Honors	Player	Position	Date Awarded	Ref.
SLC Defensive Player of the Week	Max Epps	DB	September 25, 2023	

=== Postseason All–Southland Teams ===
The Southland Conference announced the 2023 all-conference football team selections on November 22, 2023. Three Texas A&M–Commerce players were selected to the All–Conference defensive team.

Defense

1st Team

- Levi Drake Rodriguez – defensive lineman, SR
- Max Epps – defensive back, JR
- Daryion Taylor – defensive back, SR
