= List of Lamar Cardinals football seasons =

The following is a list of Lamar Cardinals football seasons for the football team that has represented Lamar University in NCAA competition.

== Seasons ==
This listing includes only the seasons Lamar competed as a four-year college beginning with the 1951 season.

Conference champions *	Bowl/Playoff game berth ^

Season	Head coach	Conference	Season results				Bowl result	Notes
Season	Head coach	Conference	Conference finish	Wins	Losses	Ties	Bowl result	Notes
Lamar Cardinals
1951	Stan Lambert	Lone Star	5th	4	6	0	—	
1952	Stan Lambert	Lone Star	5th	2	7	0	—	
1953	J. B. Higgins	Lone Star	4th	3	7	0	—	
1954	J. B. Higgins	Lone Star	6th	3	7	0	—	
1955	J. B. Higgins	Lone Star	4th	4	6	0	—	
1956	J. B. Higgins	Lone Star	5th	4	4	1	—	
1957 *	J. B. Higgins	Lone Star	T–1st	8	0	2	—	
1958	J. B. Higgins	Lone Star	T–2nd	6	2	0	—	
1959	J. B. Higgins	Lone Star	T–3rd	8	3	0	—	
1960	J. B. Higgins	Lone Star	T–2nd	8	4	0	—	
1961	J. B. Higgins	Lone Star	3rd	8	2	1	W Tangerine Bowl	Won 1961 Tangerine Bowl vs Middle Tennessee State, 21–14
1962	J. B. Higgins	Lone Star	4th	7	3	0	—	
1963	Vernon Glass	Independent	-	5	4	0	—	
1964 *	Vernon Glass	Southland Conference	1st	6	3	1	L Pecan Bowl	Lost 1964 Pecan Bowl vs Northern Iowa, 17–19
1965 *	Vernon Glass	Southland Conference	1st	6	4	0	—	
1966 *	Vernon Glass	Southland Conference	T–1st	6	4	0	—	
1967	Vernon Glass	Southland Conference	2nd	7	3	0	—	
1968	Vernon Glass	Southland Conference	5th	0	10	0	—	
1969	Vernon Glass	Southland Conference	5th	3	7	0	—	
1970	Vernon Glass	Southland Conference	2nd	3	7	0	—	
1971 *	Vernon Glass	Southland Conference	T–1st	5	6	0	—	
1972	Vernon Glass	Southland Conference	T–3rd	8	3	0	—	
1973	Vernon Glass	Southland Conference	T–2nd	5	5	0	—	
1974	Vernon Glass	Southland Conference	2nd	8	2	0	—	
1975	Vernon Glass	Southland Conference	6th	1	10	0	—	
1976	Bob Frederick	Southland Conference	6th	2	9	0	—	
1977	Bob Frederick	Southland Conference	6th	2	9	0	—	
1978	Bob Frederick	Southland Conference	6th	2	8	1	—	
1979	Larry Kennan	Southland Conference	3rd	6	3	2	—	
1980	Larry Kennan	Southland Conference	5th	3	8	0	—	
1981	Larry Kennan	Southland Conference	5th	4	6	1	—	
1982	Ken Stephens	Southland Conference	T–5th	4	7	0	—	
1983	Ken Stephens	Southland Conference	7th	2	9	0	—	
1984	Ken Stephens	Southland Conference	T–6th	2	9	0	—	
1985	Ken Stephens	Southland Conference	7th	3	8	0	—	
1986	Ray Alborn	Southland Conference	6th	2	9	0	—	
1987	Ray Alborn	Independent	-	3	8	0	—	
1988	Ray Alborn	Independent	-	3	8	0	—	
1989	Ray Alborn	Independent	-	5	5	0	—	
1990–2009	No football program							
2010	Ray Woodard	Independent	-	5	6	0	—	
2011	Ray Woodard	Southland Conference	6th	4	7	0	—	
2012	Ray Woodard	Southland Conference	7th	4	8	0	—	
2013	Ray Woodard	Southland Conference	6th	5	7	0	—	
2014	Ray Woodard	Southland Conference	T–3rd	8	4	0	—	
2015	Ray Woodard	Southland Conference	T–5th	5	6	0	—	
2016	Ray Woodard	Southland Conference	T–8th	3	8	0	—	
2017	Mike Schultz	Southland Conference	11th	2	9	0	—	
2018	Mike Schultz	Southland Conference	3rd	7	5	0	L 2018 DI FCS Playoffs	Lost 2018 DI FCS Playoffs vs Northern Iowa, 13–16
2019	Mike Schultz	Southland Conference	11th	4	8	0	—	
2020	Blane Morgan	Southland Conference	6th	2	4	0	—	
2021	Blane Morgan	Western Athletic Conference	6th	2	9	0	—	
2022	Blane Morgan	Southland Conference	8th	1	10	0	—	
2023	Peter Rossomando	Southland Conference	3rd	6	5	0	—	
2024	Peter Rossomando	Southland Conference	T–3rd	7	5	0	—	
2025	Peter Rossomando	Southland Conference	3rd	8	5	0	L 2025 D1 FCS Playoffs	Lost 2025 D1 FCS Playoffs vs Abilene Christian, 38-20
Total				239	316	9	(only includes regular season games)	
Total				1	2	0	(only includes bowl games and playoff games)	
Total				240	318	9	(all games)	

== See also ==
Lamar Cardinals football
