= Larry Haynes (quarterback) =

American football player

Profile
- Position: Quarterback

Career information
- College: Tyler Junior College (1976–1977): Lamar (1978–1979)

Career history
- Green Bay Packers*; Montreal Alouettes*
- * Offseason or practice squad member only

Larry Haynes (born c. 1958) is a former American football quarterback. He played college football at Tyler Junior College in 1976 and 1977 and for the Lamar Cardinals in 1978 and 1979. As a senior in 1979, he ranked among the leading quarterbacks in major-college football with 2,641 passing yards (3rd), 233 pass completions (3rd), 402 pass attempts (3rd), 240.1 yards gained per game played (3rd), 21 passing touchdowns (3rd), 451 total plays (5th), 2,428 total yards (6th), and 18 passing interceptions (6th). Haynes spent time with the Green Bay Packers and Montreal Alouettes after his college career ended. He later became a high school football coach in Texas. In 26 years as a high school coach, he compiled a 163–112–3 record.

Haynes was inducted into the Lamar Hall of Fame in 2003.
