= 2023 Lamar Cardinals football team =

American college football season

2023 Lamar Cardinals football
- Conference: Southland Conference
- Record: 6–5 (5–2 Southland)
- Head coach: Peter Rossomando (1st season)
- Offensive coordinator: Will Fleming (1st season)
- Offensive scheme: Spread option
- Defensive coordinator: Drew Christ (1st season)
- Base defense: 4–3
- Home stadium: Provost Umphrey Stadium

2023 Southland Conference football standings
| | Conf. | | | Overall |
| Team | W | | L | W | | L |
|---|---|---|---|---|---|---|
| Nicholls $^ | 7 | – | 0 | 6 | – | 5 |
| No. 22 Incarnate Word | 6 | – | 1 | 8 | – | 2 |
| Lamar | 5 | – | 2 | 6 | – | 5 |
| Houston Christian | 4 | – | 3 | 5 | – | 5 |
| Southeastern Louisiana | 3 | – | 4 | 3 | – | 8 |
| Texas A&M–Commerce * | 2 | – | 5 | 1 | – | 9 |
| McNeese | 1 | – | 6 | 0 | – | 10 |
| Northwestern State ** | 0 | – | 2 | 0 | – | 6 |
$ – Conference champion; ^ – FCS playoff participant; * – Texas A&M–Commerce ineligible for FCS postseason play due to transition from NCAA Division II. ** – Northwestern State canceled its season on October 26.; Rankings from STATS Poll

The 2023 Lamar Cardinals football team represented Lamar University in the 2023 NCAA Division I FCS football season. The Cardinals played their home games at Provost Umphrey Stadium in Beaumont, Texas, and competed in the Southland Conference. They were led by first–year head coach Pete Rossomando. The Cardinals finished the season with a 6–5 overall record, and a 5–2 record in Southland Conference play for a third-place conference finish. The 2023 season was the first season since 2018 with an overall winning record.

== Preseason ==
=== Recruiting ===
| Back | B | Center | C | Cornerback | CB | Defensive back | DB |
| Defensive end | DE | Defensive lineman | DL | Defensive tackle | DT | End | E |
| Fullback | FB | Guard | G | Halfback | HB | Kicker | K |
| Kickoff returner | KR | Offensive tackle | OT | Offensive lineman | OL | Linebacker | LB |
| Long snapper | LS | Punter | P | Punt returner | PR | Quarterback | QB |
| Running back | RB | Safety | S | Tight end | TE | Wide receiver | WR |

==== Incoming transfers ====
The Cardinals added 11 transfer players. One was signed during the early signing period. The remaining ten were signed on National Signing Day.

| Name | Pos. | Height | Weight | Hometown | Year | Prev school |
|---|---|---|---|---|---|---|
| Kevin Anderson | S | 6’0 | 200 | Lewisville, TX | Senior | Texas State |
| Knox Boyd | OL | 6’0 | 290 | Denton, TX | Sophomore | Charlotte |
| Robert Coleman | QB | 6’2 | 200 | Riverside, CA | Junior | Mt. San Jacinto College |
| Koronje (KJ) Gilbert | DB | 5’10 | 175 | Katy, TX | Sophomore | Trinity Valley Community College |
| Andrew Hardin | S | 6’2 | 200 | Woodbridge, VA | Sophomore | Youngstown State |
| Foday Jollah | LB | 6’2 | 220 | Reading, PA | Senior | Eastern Illinois |
| Joshua Landrum | S/CB | 6’0 | 190 | Cedar Hill, TX | Junior | Rice |
| James Perkins | DL | 6’4 | 260 | Monroe, LA | Sophomore | Louisiana–Monroe |
| Elias Ripley | OL | 6’2 | 290 | Cedar Rapids, IA | Junior | Iowa Western |
| Jah'mar Sanders | WR | 5’11 | 180 | Port Arthur, TX | | New Mexico |
| Jonavan Tillis | LB | 6’3 | 230 | Tampa, FL | Sophomore | Mt. San Jacinto College |

==== Incoming high school recruits ====
Sources: Lamar signed 17 high school recruits with 5 signed on Early Signing Day and 12 added on National Signing Day.

College recruiting information (2023)
| Name | Hometown | School | Height | Weight | 40^{‡} | Commit date |
|---|---|---|---|---|---|---|
| Iyioluwa Adekoya; TE/DE | Round Rock, TX | Cedar Ridge High School | 6 ft 4 in (1.93 m) | 235 lb (107 kg) | – | |
| Iyioluwa Adekoya; TE/DE | Recruit ratings: No ratings found | | | | | |
| Brenden Bradshaw; DB | Denton, TX | John H. Guyer High School | 6 ft 1 in (1.85 m) | 180 lb (82 kg) | – | |
| Brenden Bradshaw; DB | Recruit ratings: No ratings found | | | | | |
| Koda Canady; LB | Jacksonville, TX | Jacksonville High School | 6 ft 3 in (1.91 m) | 210 lb (95 kg) | – | |
| Koda Canady; LB | Recruit ratings: No ratings found | | | | | |
| Peyton Christian; DL | Kilgore, TX | Kilgore High School | 6 ft 1 in (1.85 m) | 290 lb (130 kg) | – | |
| Peyton Christian; DL | Recruit ratings: No ratings found | | | | | |
| Zachery Curtis; OL | Dallas, TX | Bishop Lynch High School | 6 ft 4 in (1.93 m) | 260 lb (120 kg) | – | |
| Zachery Curtis; OL | Recruit ratings: No ratings found | | | | | |
| Jamarion Evans; DB | Center, TX | Center High School | 6 ft 0 in (1.83 m) | 185 lb (84 kg) | – | |
| Jamarion Evans; DB | Recruit ratings: No ratings found | | | | | |
| Alex Haralson; DE | Argyle, TX | Fort Worth Christian High School | 6 ft 5 in (1.96 m) | 250 lb (110 kg) | – | |
| Alex Haralson; DE | Recruit ratings: No ratings found | | | | | |
| Carter Holmes; WR | Beaumont, TX | West Brook High School | 6 ft 0 in (1.83 m) | 190 lb (86 kg) | – | |
| Carter Holmes; WR | Recruit ratings: No ratings found | | | | | |
| Rashaad Johnson; RB | Houston, TX | North Shore High School | 5 ft 9 in (1.75 m) | 220 lb (100 kg) | – | |
| Rashaad Johnson; RB | Recruit ratings: No ratings found | | | | | |
| Royce Maloles; DL | Cypress, TX | Cypress Ranch High School | 6 ft 2 in (1.88 m) | 240 lb (110 kg) | | |
| Royce Maloles; DL | Recruit ratings: No ratings found | | | | | |
| Aiden McCown; QB | Rusk, TX | Rusk High School | 6 ft 2 in (1.88 m) | 180 lb (82 kg) | – | |
| Aiden McCown; QB | Recruit ratings: No ratings found | | | | | |
| Ashton (Makhi) Reed; DL | Minden, LA | Minden High School | 6 ft 3 in (1.91 m) | 300 lb (140 kg) | – | |
| Ashton (Makhi) Reed; DL | Recruit ratings: No ratings found | | | | | |
| Kei'trone Simpson; DE | Dallas, TX | Duncanville High School | 6 ft 2 in (1.88 m) | 220 lb (100 kg) | – | |
| Kei'trone Simpson; DE | Recruit ratings: No ratings found | | | | | |
| Alex Sumler; DE | New Orleans, LA | McDonogh 35 High School | 6 ft 3 in (1.91 m) | 240 lb (110 kg) | – | |
| Alex Sumler; DE | Recruit ratings: No ratings found | | | | | |
| Cecil (Tre) Turner; CB | Arlington, TX | Liberty Christian High School | 6 ft 2 in (1.88 m) | 180 lb (82 kg) | – | |
| Cecil (Tre) Turner; CB | Recruit ratings: No ratings found | | | | | |
| Jayron Williams; LB | Silsbee, TX | Silsbee High School | 6 ft 2 in (1.88 m) | 230 lb (100 kg) | – | |
| Jayron Williams; LB | Recruit ratings: No ratings found | | | | | |
| Kortez Winslow; OL | Houston, TX | Nimitz High School | 6 ft 4 in (1.93 m) | 280 lb (130 kg) | – | |
| Kortez Winslow; OL | Recruit ratings: No ratings found | | | | | |
Overall recruit ranking:
Note: In many cases, Scout, Rivals, 247Sports, On3, and ESPN may conflict in their listings of height and weight.; In these cases, the average was taken. ESPN grades are on a 100-point scale.; Sources: "2023 Team Ranking". Rivals.com.

=== Preseason poll ===
The Southland Conference released their preseason poll on July 24, 2023. The Cardinals were picked to finish seventh in the conference.

=== Preseason All-Southland Teams ===
The Southland Conference announced the 2023 preseason all-conference football team selections on July 21, 2023. Lamar had a total of 4 players selected.

Offense

1st Team

- Khalan Griffin – running back, JR

2nd Team

- Sevonne Rhea – wide receiver, SO

Defense

2nd Team

- Kristian Pugh – defensive back, SO
- Ramond Stevens – defensive back, JR

== Schedule ==
| Date | Time | Opponent | Site | TV | Result | Attendance |
|---|---|---|---|---|---|---|
| August 31 | 7:00 p.m. | No. 8 Idaho* | Provost Umphrey Stadium; Beaumont, TX | ESPN+ | L 17–42 | 5,321 |
| September 9 | 7:00 p.m. | at Louisiana–Monroe* | Malone Stadium; Monroe, LA | ESPN+ | L 14–24 | 13,154 |
| September 16 | 1:00 p.m. | at South Dakota* | DakotaDome; Vermillion, SD | ESPN+ | L 6–35 | 5,618 |
| September 23 | 6:00 p.m. | Lincoln (CA)* | Provost Umphrey Stadium; Beaumont, TX | ESPN+ | W 38–0 | 4,873 |
| September 30 | 6:00 p.m. | at Houston Christian | Husky Stadium; Houston, TX | ESPN+ | W 21–19 | 1,547 |
| October 7 | 3:00 p.m. | Northwestern State | Provost Umphrey Stadium; Beaumont, TX | ESPN+ | W 27–13 | 5,263 |
| October 14 | 3:00 p.m. | at Southeastern Louisiana | Strawberry Stadium; Hammond, LA | ESPN+ | W 30–24 | 4,152 |
| October 28 | 3:00 p.m. | No. 8 Incarnate Word | Provost Umphrey Stadium; Beaumont, TX | ESPN+ | L 7–17 | 6,593 |
| November 4 | 3:00 p.m. | Texas A&M–Commerce^{†} | Provost Umphrey Stadium; Beaumont, TX | ESPN+ | W 41–21 | 6,123 |
| November 11 | 3:00 p.m. | at Nicholls | Manning Field at John L. Guidry Stadium; Thibodaux, LA | ESPN+ | L 24–37 | 6,845 |
| November 18 | 3:00 p.m. | McNeese | Provost Umphrey Stadiuim; Beaumont, TX (Battle of the Border) | ESPN+ | W 52–27 | 5,683 |
*Non-conference game; ^{†}Homecoming; Rankings from STATS Poll released prior to the game; All times are in Central time

== Game summaries ==
=== No. 8 Idaho ===
Game One – No 8. Idaho at Lamar Cardinals

| Quarter | 1 | 2 | 3 | 4 | Total |
|---|---|---|---|---|---|
| No. 8 Idaho | 14 | 14 | 7 | 7 | 42 |
| Cardinals (LU) | 0 | 0 | 3 | 14 | 17 |

at Provost Umphrey Stadium, Beaumont, TX

- Date: August 31
- Game time: 7:00 p.m.
- Game weather: • Wind: E 10 mph • Weather: Sunny • Temp: 97
- Game attendance: 5,321
- Referee: Craig Hesler
- TV: ESPN+
- Box Score

Game information

First Quarter

- UID – 7:54 Hayden Hatten 6 yd pass from McCoy, Gevani (Pope, Cameron kick) UID 7–0 Drive: 11 plays, 75 yards, TOP 07:06
- UID – 4:45 Woods, Anthony 9 yd run (Pope, Cameron kick) UID 14–0 Drive: 4 plays, 46 yards, TOP 01:30

Second Quarter

- UID – 7:30 Woods, Anthony 6 yd run UID 20–0 Drive: 11 plays, 96 yards, TOP 06:40
- UID – 00:33 Hatten, Hayden 20 yd pass from McCoy, Gevani (Cox, Jake pass) UID 28–0 Drive: 4 plays, 90 yards, TOP 01:17

Third Quarter

- UID – 12:39 Romano, Nick 45 yd pass from Hatten, Hayden (Prescott, Logan kick) UID 35–0 Drive: 2 plays, 47 yards, TOP 00:28
- LU – 4:46 Esqueda, Chris 30 yd field goalUID 35–3 Drive: 10 plays, 37 yards, TOP 04:38

Fourth Quarter

- UID – 9:08 Cox, Jake 15 yd pass from Layne, Jack (Prescott, Logan kick) UID 42–3 Drive: 6 plays, 60 yards, TOP 03:06
- LU – 4:55 Griffin, Khalan 2 yd run (Esqueda, Chris kick) UID 42–10 Drive: 7 plays, 75 yards, TOP 04:13
- LU – 3:29 Hall, Trae 12 yd pass from Coleman, Robert (Esqueda, Chris kick) UID 42–17 Drive: 5 plays, 39 yards, TOP 01:16

| Statistics | UID | LU |
|---|---|---|
| First downs | 20 | 16 |
| Plays–yards | 57–497 | 55–190 |
| Rushes–yards | 36–273 | 31–71 |
| Passing yards | 224 | 119 |
| Passing: comp–att–int | 16–21–1 | 15–24–1 |
| Time of possession | 30:16 | 29:44 |

| Team | Category | Player | Statistics |
|---|---|---|---|
| Idaho | Passing | Gevani McCoy | 14/19-1; 164 yards; long 29 yards; TDs 2; sack 1 |
| Idaho | Rushing | Anthony Woods | 13 attempts; gain 138 yds; long 93 yds; TDs 2 |
| Idaho | Receiving | Hayden Hatten | 6 receptions; 86 total yds; TD 2; long 29 yds |
| Lamar | Passing | Robert Coleman | 15/24-1; 119 total yds; Int 1; long 34 yds; sack 3 |
| Lamar | Rushing | Khalan Griffin | 12 attempts; gained 44 yds; loss 2 yds; long 9; TD 1 |
| Lamar | Receiving | Andre Dennis | 1 reception; 34 yds; long 34 yds |

=== @ Louisiana–Monroe ===
Game Two – Lamar Cardinals at Louisiana–Monroe

| Quarter | 1 | 2 | 3 | 4 | Total |
|---|---|---|---|---|---|
| Lamar | 0 | 0 | 0 | 14 | 14 |
| Louisiana–Monroe | 7 | 14 | 0 | 3 | 24 |

at Malone Stadium, Monroe, LA

- Date: September 9
- Game time: 7:00 p.m.
- Game weather: • Wind: N 8 mph • Weather: Clear • Temp: 86
- Game attendance: 13,154
- Referee: Bruce Austin
- TV: ESPN+
- Box Score

Game information

First Quarter

- ULM – 00:43 Smith, Hunter 27 yd run (McCormick, Derek kick) ULM 7–0 Drive: 9 plays, 60 yards, TOP 02:42

Second Quarter

- ULM – 5:36 Driggers, Tristan 0 yd punt return (McCormick, Derek kick) ULM 14–0
- ULM – 2:17 Franklin, Jr., Thad 1 yd run (McCormick, Derek kick) ULM 21–0 Drive: 6 plays, 63 yards, TOP 02:34

Third Quarter

No Scores

Fourth Quarter

- LU – 12:37 Bowden, Major 19 yd pass from Coleman, Robert (Esqueda, Chris kick) ULM 14–7 Drive: 12 plays, 72 yards, TOP 06:12
- LU – 8:16 Jones, Izaha 47 yd run (Esqueda, Chris kick) UID 42–10 Drive: 4 plays, 63 yards, TOP 02:06
- LU – 3:35 McCormick, Derek 30 yd field goal ULM 24–14 Drive: 9 plays, 59 yards, TOP 04:33

| Statistics | LU | ULM |
|---|---|---|
| First downs | 17 | 19 |
| Plays–yards | 62–311 | 40–285 |
| Rushes–yards | 36–121 | 31–71 |
| Passing yards | 190 | 99 |
| Passing: comp–att–int | 19–26–2 | 12–22–0 |
| Time of possession | 33:58 | 26:02 |

| Team | Category | Player | Statistics |
|---|---|---|---|
| Lamar | Passing | Robert Coleman | 19/25-1; 190 yards; long 23 yards; TDs 1; sack 4 |
| Lamar | Rushing | Izaha Jones | 13 attempts; gain 138 yds; long 93 yds; TDs 2 |
| Lamar | Receiving | Hayden Hatten | 1 receptions; 47 total yds; long 47 yds |
| Louisiana–Monroe | Passing | Hunter Herring | 12/21-0; 99 total yds; long 28 yds; sack 1 |
| Louisiana–Monroe | Rushing | Isaiah Woullard | 14 attempts; gained 116 yds; loss 3 yds; long 44 |
| Louisiana–Monroe | Receiving | Tyronne Howell | 4 reception; 65 yds; long 28 yds |

=== @ South Dakota ===
Game Three – Lamar Cardinals at South Dakota Coyotes

| Quarter | 1 | 2 | 3 | 4 | Total |
|---|---|---|---|---|---|
| Lamar | 3 | 3 | 0 | 0 | 6 |
| South Dakota | 0 | 7 | 14 | 14 | 35 |

at DakotaDome, Vermillion, SD

- Date: September 16
- Game time: 1:00 p.m.
- Game weather: Weather: Indoor • Temp: 72
- Game attendance: 5,618
- Referee: Aaron Adams
- TV: ESPN+
- Box Score

Game information

First Quarter

- LU – 4:53 Esqueda, Chris 26 yd field goal LU 3–0 Drive: 7 plays, 12 yards, TOP 03:25

Second Quarter

- LU – 10:06 Esqueda, Chris 26 yd field goal LU 6–0 Drive: 13 plays, 75 yards, TOP 06:45
- USD – 02:14 Theis, Travis 2 yd run (Leyland, Will kick) USD 6–7 Drive: 13 plays, 75 yards, TOP 07:52

Third Quarter

- USD – 9:27 Thomas, Nate 1 yd run (Leyland, Will kick), USD 6–14 Drive: 9 plays, 73 yards, TOP 05:27
- USD – 4:12 Galbreath, JJ 20 yd pass from Bouman, Aidan (Leyland, Will kick) USD 6–21 Drive: 5 plays, 65 yards, TOP 02:35

Fourth Quarter

- USD – 10:47 Theis, Travis 32 yd run (Leyland, Will kick) USD 6–28 Drive: 7 plays, 80 yards, TOP 03:50
- USD – 3:23 Homas, Nate 2 yd run (Mata, Zeke kick) USD 6–35 Drive: 6 plays, 50 yards, TOP 04:09

Statistics

| Statistics | Lamar | South Dakota |
|---|---|---|
| First downs | 22 | 22 |
| Total yards | 274 | 401 |
| Rushing yards | 105 | 305 |
| Passing yards | 169 | 96 |
| Turnovers | 2 | 2 |
| Time of possession | 31:41 | 28:19 |

| Team | Category | Player | Statistics |
|---|---|---|---|
| Lamar | Passing | Robert Coleman | 14/24; 144 yds; 1 Int; long 25 yds; sack 7 |
| Lamar | Rushing | Khalan Griffin | 15 attempts; 63 yds; long 10 |
| Lamar | Receiving | Kyndon Fuselier | 4 receptions; 37 yds; long 12 |
| South Dakota | Passing | Aidan Bouman | 7/9; 96 yds; 1 Int; 1 TD; long 29 yds |
| South Dakota | Rushing | Nate Thomas | 19 attempts; 164 yds; long 29; 2 TDs |
| South Dakota | Receiving | Jack Martens | 2 receptions; 34 yds; long 29 |

=== Lincoln (CA) ===
Game Four – Lincoln (CA) at Lamar Cardinals

| Quarter | 1 | 2 | 3 | 4 | Total |
|---|---|---|---|---|---|
| Lincoln (CA) | 0 | 0 | 0 | 0 | 0 |
| Lamar | 14 | 10 | 7 | 7 | 38 |

at Provost Umphrey Stadium, Beaumont, TX

- Date: September 23
- Game time: 6:00 p.m.
- Game weather: • Wind: SE 9 mph • Weather: Sunny • Temp: 90
- Game attendance: 4,873
- Referee: Ed Bourgeois
- TV: ESPN+
- Box Score

Statistics

| Statistics | Oaklanders | Cardinals |
|---|---|---|
| First downs | 10 | 26 |
| Total yards | 97 | 480 |
| Rushing yards | 75 | 288 |
| Passing yards | 22 | 192 |
| Turnovers | 0 | 1 |
| Time of possession | 29:42 | 30:18 |

| Team | Category | Player | Statistics |
|---|---|---|---|
| Oaklanders | Passing | TJ Goodwin | 1/18; 18 yds; long 8; sack 5 |
| Oaklanders | Rushing | Otis Weah | 13 attempts; 52 yds gain; 9 loss; long 14 |
| Oaklanders | Receiving | Shammon Gennes | 4 receptions; 14 yds; long 8 yds. |
| Lamar | Passing | Robert Coleman | 15/19; 192 yds; long 54; sack 1 |
| Lamar | Rushing | Khalan Griffin | 12 attempts; 117 yds gain; 1 TD; Long 40 yds |
| Lamar | Receiving | Major Bowden | 4 receptions; 60 yds; long 38 yds. |

=== @ Houston Christian ===
Game Five – Lamar Cardinals at Houston Christian Huskies

| Quarter | 1 | 2 | 3 | 4 | Total |
|---|---|---|---|---|---|
| Cardinals | 0 | 14 | 0 | 7 | 21 |
| Huskies | 0 | 3 | 3 | 13 | 19 |

at Husky Stadium, Houston, TX

- Date: September 30
- Game time: 6:00 p.m.
- Game weather: Weather: Sunny • Temp: 90
- Game attendance: 1,547
- Referee: James Brookhart
- TV: ESPN+
- Box Score

Statistics

| Statistics | Lamar | Huskies |
|---|---|---|
| First downs | 22 | 25 |
| Total yards | 412 | 417 |
| Rushing yards | 118 | 189 |
| Passing yards | 294 | 228 |
| Turnovers | 3 | 1 |
| Time of possession | 29:41 | 30:19 |

| Team | Category | Player | Statistics |
|---|---|---|---|
| Lamar | Passing | Robert Coleman | 19/30; 294 yds.; 2 TDs; long 41 yds; 3 sacks |
| Lamar | Rushing | Khalan Griffin | 17 attempts; 74 yds; long 14 yds |
| Lamar | Receiving | Izaha Jones | 7 receptions; 101 yds; long 36 yds |
| Houston Christian | Passing | Colby Suits | 17/35; 228 yds; long 52 yds; 4 sacks |
| Houston Christian | Rushing | Darryle Evans | 24 attempts; 136 yds gain; 4 yds loss; long 24 yds |
| Houston Christian | Receiving | Karl Reynolds | 6 receptions; 112 yds; long 52 yds. |

=== Northwestern State ===
Game Six – Northwestern State Demons at Lamar Cardinals

| Quarter | 1 | 2 | 3 | 4 | Total |
|---|---|---|---|---|---|
| Demons | 0 | 7 | 6 | 0 | 13 |
| Cardinals | 7 | 6 | 0 | 14 | 27 |

at Provost Umphrey Stadium, Beaumont, Texas

- Date: October 7
- Game time: 3:00 p.m. CDT
- Game weather: Sunny, 80 °F (27 °C)
- Game attendance: 5,263
- Referee: Matt Beck
- TV: ESPN+
- Box score

Game information
First quarter
- LU – Khalan Griffin 3-yard run (Chris Esqueda kick), 8:22. Cardinals 7–0. Drive: 13 plays, 75 yards, 6:38.

Second quarter

- NWST – Chance Newman 1-yard run (Brett Money kick), 11:17. Tied 7–7 Drive: 8 plays, 41 yards, 3:34.
- LU – Damashja Harris 95-yard kickoff return (kick failed), 11:03. Cardinals 13–7

Third quarter

- NWST – Brett Money 48-yard field goal, 9:55. Cardinals 13–10. Drive: 11 plays, 32 yards, 4:59.
- NWST – Brett Money 45-yard field goal, 0:08. Tied 13–13. Drive: 4 plays, 1 yard, 0:56.

Fourth quarter

- LU – Andre Dennis 45-yard pass from Robert Coleman (Chris Esqueda kick), 13:58. Cardinals 20–13. Drive: 4 plays, 75 yards, 1:10.
- LU – R. J. Carver 3-yard run (Chris Esqueda kick), 4:18. Cardinals 27–13. Drive: 5 plays, 15 yards, 2:16.

| Statistics | NWST | LAM |
|---|---|---|
| First downs | 16 | 15 |
| Total yards | 221 | 265 |
| Rushing yards | 81 | 122 |
| Passing yards | 140 | 143 |
| Turnovers | 1 | 0 |
| Time of possession | 29:52 | 30:08 |

| Team | Category | Player | Statistics |
|---|---|---|---|
| Northwestern State | Passing | Quaterius Hawkins | 20/33, 140 yards, Int 1; long 28 yds; sack 3 |
| Northwestern State | Rushing | Kennieth Lacy | 6 rushes; 28 yards; long 10 yds |
| Northwestern State | Receiving | Zach Patterson | 4 receptions; 42 yards; long 28 yds |
| Lamar | Passing | Robert Coleman | 9/20, 143 yards, TD 1; long 45 yds; sack 1 |
| Lamar | Rushing | Khalan Griffin | 18 rushes; 96 yards; loss 3 yds; TD 1; long 21 yds |
| Lamar | Receiving | Andre Dennis | 3 receptions, 78 yards; long 45 yds. |

=== @ Southeastern Louisiana ===
Game Seven – Lamar Cardinals at Southeastern Louisiana Lions

| Quarter | 1 | 2 | 3 | 4 | Total |
|---|---|---|---|---|---|
| Cardinals | 10 | 20 | 0 | 0 | 30 |
| Lions | 10 | 0 | 7 | 7 | 24 |

at Strawberry Stadium • Hammond, Louisiana

- Date: Saturday, October 14, 2023
- Game time: 3:00 p.m. CDT
- Game weather: Wind: NW 13 • Weather: Sunny • Temp: 78
- Game attendance: 4,152
- Referee: Ed Bourgeois
- TV: ESPN+
- Box Score

Game information

First quarter

- SELA - 12:55 - Callaghan, Riley 31 yd field goal 6 plays SELA 0-3 62 yards, TOP 02:05
- LU - 8:15 - Esqueda, Chris 43 yd field goal SELA 3-3 9 plays, 39 yards, TOP 04:38
- SELA - 5:01 - Lewis, Darius 28 yd pass from Sawyer, Eli (Callaghan, Riley kick) SELA 3-10 6 plays, 75 yards, TOP 03:16
- LU - 2:09 - Gilbert, K.J. 60 yd fumble recovery (Esqueda, Chris kick) SELA 10-10

Second quarter

- LU - 7:23 - Bowden, Major 4 yd run (Esqueda, Chris kick) LU 17-10 7 plays, 51 yards, TOP 02:57
- LU - 2:59 - Rhea, Sevonne 35 yd pass from Coleman, Robert ( ) LU 23-10 7 plays, 74 yards, TOP 03:17
- LU - 1:11 - Rhea, Sevonne 37 yd pass from Coleman, Robert (Esqueda, Chris kick) LU 30-10 1 plays, 37 yards, TOP 00:08

Third quarter

- SELA - 1:44 - Sharp, Bauer 7 yd run (Callaghan, Riley kick) LU 30-17 12 plays, 75 yards, TOP 05:07

Fourth quarter

- SELA - 9:29 - Lewis, Darius 19 yd pass from Clement, Zachary (Callaghan, Riley kick) LU 30-24 8 plays, 70 yards, TOP 03:22

| Statistics | LU | SLU |
|---|---|---|
| First downs | 17 | 22 |
| Plays–yards | 59-359 | 65-453 |
| Rushes–yards | 102 | 102 |
| Passing yards | 257 | 351 |
| Passing: comp–att–int | 17/22-0 | 21/34-2 |
| Time of possession | 32:26 | 27:34 |

| Team | Category | Player | Statistics |
|---|---|---|---|
| Lamar | Passing | Robert Coleman | 17/22; 257 total yds; long 42; TD 3; sack 3 |
| Lamar | Rushing | Khalan Griffin | 23 attempts; gained 74 yds.; lost 3 yds; long 14 yds. |
| Lamar | Receiving | Sevonne Rhea | 6 receptions; total 133 yds; TDs 2; long 37 yds. |
| Southeastern Louisiana | Passing | Eli Sawyer | 9/16; 210 total yds.; long 58 yds; TD 1; Int 2; sack 2 |
| Southeastern Louisiana | Rushing | Zachary Clement | 8 attempts; gained 34 yds; lost 1 yd; long 30 yds. |
| Southeastern Louisiana | Receiving | Xavier Hill | 4 receptions; total 106 yds; long 38 yds. |

=== Incarnate Word ===
Game Eight – Incarnate Word Cardinals at Lamar Cardinals

| Quarter | 1 | 2 | 3 | 4 | Total |
|---|---|---|---|---|---|
| No. 8 Cardinals (UIW) | 7 | 7 | 0 | 3 | 17 |
| Cardinals (LU) | 7 | 0 | 0 | 0 | 7 |

at Provost Umphrey Stadium, Beaumont, TX

- Date: October 28
- Game time: 3:00 p.m.
- Game weather: • Wind: SE 10 mph • Weather: Sunny
- Game attendance: 6,593
- Referee: Gary Leeper
- TV: ESPN+
- Box Score

Game information

First Quarter

- UIW – 3:31 Brandon Porter 24 yard pass from Richard Torres, Mason Lawler kick UIW 7–0 Drive: 4 plays, 35 yards, 1:43
- LU – 3:19 Sevonne Rhea 75 yard pass from Cameron George, Chris Esqueda kick Tied 7–7 Drive: 1 play, 75 yards, 0:12

Second Quarter

- UIW – 14:38 Dalton Meyer 18 yard pass from Richard Torres, Mason Lawler kick UIW 14–7 Drive: 9 plays, 76 yards, 3:33

Third Quarter

No scoring

Fourth Quarter

- UIW – 2:01 Mason Lawler 27 yard field goal UIW 17–7 Drive: 9 plays, 50 yards, 4:44

| Statistics | UIW | LU |
|---|---|---|
| First downs | 23 | 11 |
| Plays–yards | 77–459 | 58–248 |
| Rushes–yards | 40–152 | 32–73 |
| Passing yards | 307 | 175 |
| Passing: comp–att–int | 24–37–0 | 12–26–1 |
| Time of possession | 33:15 | 26:45 |

| Team | Category | Player | Statistics |
|---|---|---|---|
| Incarnate Word | Passing | Richard Torres | 24/37; total 307 yds; TDs 2; long 44 yds; sack 1 |
| Incarnate Word | Rushing | Dekalon Taylor | 12 attempts; gain 83 yds; long 19 yds; |
| Incarnate Word | Receiving | Brandon Porter | 6 receptions; 101 total yds; TD 1; long 37 yds |
| Lamar | Passing | Robert Coleman | 11/25; 100 total yds; Int 1; long 30 yds; sack 4 |
| Lamar | Rushing | Khalan Griffin | 16 attempts; gained 56 yds; loss 6 yds; long 8; |
| Lamar | Receiving | Sevonne Rhea | 6 receptions; 120 yds; long 75 yds; TD 1 |

=== Texas A&M–Commerce ===
Game Nine – Texas A&M–Commerce at Lamar Cardinals

| Quarter | 1 | 2 | 3 | 4 | Total |
|---|---|---|---|---|---|
| Lions | 0 | 7 | 0 | 14 | 21 |
| Cardinals | 7 | 14 | 7 | 13 | 41 |

at Provost Umphrey Stadium, Beaumont, TX

- Date: November 4
- Game time: 3:00 p.m.
- Game weather: • Wind: SE 8 mph • Weather: Sunny • Temp: 82
- Game attendance: 6,123
- Referee: Matt Beck
- TV: ESPN+
- Box Score

Statistics

| Statistics | TAMU–Commerce | Lamar |
|---|---|---|
| First downs | 19 | 16 |
| Total yards | 300 | 342 |
| Rushing yards | 102 | 246 |
| Passing yards | 198 | 96 |
| Turnovers | 4 | 1 |
| Time of possession | 27:37 | 32:23 |

| Team | Category | Player | Statistics |
|---|---|---|---|
| Texas A&M–Commerce | Passing | Mirko Martos | 9/16; 102 total yds; TD 1; long 24; sacks 1 |
| Texas A&M–Commerce | Rushing | Shamenski Rucker | 12 attempts; gained 47 yds; lost 11 yds; long 14 yds |
| Texas A&M–Commerce | Receiving | Austin Samaha | 4 receptions; 65 yards; long 26 yds |
| Lamar | Passing | Robert Coleman | 8/14; 96 yds total; TDs 2; Int 1; long 35 yds; sack 2 |
| Lamar | Rushing | Khalan Griffin | 19 attempts; gained 114 yds; lost 1 yd; TD 1; long 51 yds |
| Lamar | Receiving | Andre Dennis | 5 receptions; 43 yds; long 25 yds |

=== @ Nicholls ===
Game 10 – Lamar Cardinals at Nicholls Colonels

| Quarter | 1 | 2 | 3 | 4 | Total |
|---|---|---|---|---|---|
| Cardinals | 7 | 4 | 7 | 6 | 24 |
| Colonels | 7 | 13 | 14 | 3 | 37 |

at Manning Field at John L. Guidry Stadium, Thibodaux, LA

- Date: November 11, 2023
- Game time: 3:00 p.m. CST
- Game weather: Weather: Cloudy
- Game attendance: 6,845
- Referee: Gary Leeper
- TV: ESPN+
- Box Score

Game information

First Quarter

- LU - 9:12 - Carver, RJ 1 yd run (Esqueda, Chris kick) LU 7-0 Drive: 11 plays, 76 yards, TOP 05:41
- NIC - 5:00 - Spears, Jaylon 29 yd pass from McQuaide, Pat (Lasseigne, Gavin kick) TIED 7-7 Drive: 8 plays, 68 yards, TOP 04:06

Second Quarter

- NIC - 13:09 - McQuaide, Pat 3 yd pass from McQuaide, Pat (kick) NIC 7-13 Drive: 9 plays, 51 yards, TOP 04:35
- LU - 13:09 - Stevens, Ramond 95 yd PAT return NIC 9-13
- NIC - 10:48 - Spears, Jaylon 69 yd run (Lasseigne, Gavin kick) NIC 7-20 Drive: 4 plays, 86 yards, TOP 01:21
- LU - 4:07 - Maloles, Royce 0 yd safety NIC 11-20

Third Quarter

- LU - 7:45 - Fuselier, Kyndon 19 yd pass from Coleman, Robert (Esqueda, Chris kick) NIC 18-20 Drive: 6 plays, 69 yards, TOP 02:38
- NIC - 6:29 - Robinson, David 15 yd pass from McQuaide, Pat (Lasseigne, Gavin kick) NIC 18-27 Drive: 3 plays, 90 yards, TOP 01:09
- NIC - 3:05 - Spears, Jaylon 14 yd run (Lasseigne, Gavin kick) NIC 18-34 Drive: 6 plays, 38 yards, TOP 03:07

Fourth Quarter

- LU - 14:54 - Gibbs, Devyn 14 yd pass from Coleman, Robert ( ) NIC 24-34 Drive: 8 plays, 90 yards, TOP 03:02
- NIC - 8:35 - Lasseigne, Gavin 28 yd field goal NIC 24-37 Drive: 10 plays, 57 yards, TOP 06:10

Statistics

| Statistics | Lamar | Nicholls |
|---|---|---|
| First downs | 18 | 24 |
| Total yards | 416 | 455 |
| Rushing yards | 127 | 349 |
| Passing yards | 289 | 106 |
| Turnovers | 3 | 0 |
| Time of possession | 26:14 | 33:46 |

| Team | Category | Player | Statistics |
|---|---|---|---|
| Lamar | Passing | Robert Coleman | 17/35; 289 total yds; TDs 2; INT 2; long 38 yds; sack 3 |
| Lamar | Rushing | Robert Coleman | 14 attempts; gained 93 yds; lost 21 yds; long 28 yds |
| Lamar | Receiving | Kyndon Fuselier | 3 receptions; 77 yds; TD 1; long 34 yds |
| Nicholls | Passing | Pat McQuaide | 9/17; 106 yds; TD 3; long 40 yds |
| Nicholls | Rushing | Jaylon Spears | 16 attempts; gained 177 yds; TDs 2; long 69 yds |
| Nicholls | Receiving | Lee Negrotto | 1 reception; 40 yds; |

=== McNeese ===
Game Eleven – McNeese Cowboys at Lamar Cardinals

| Quarter | 1 | 2 | 3 | 4 | Total |
|---|---|---|---|---|---|
| Cowboys | 7 | 0 | 14 | 6 | 27 |
| Cardinals | 14 | 14 | 14 | 10 | 52 |

at Provost Umphrey Stadium, Beaumont, TX

- Date: November 18
- Game time: 3:00 p.m.
- Game weather: • Wind: mph • Weather:
- Game attendance: 5,683
- Referee: Matt Beck
- TV announcers (ESPN+): Bob Slovak and Lemont Williams

Game information

First Quarter

- McN – 10:29: Hayes, Tyronne 30 yd pass from Sixkiller, Kamden (Smith, Garrison kick) McN 7–0 8 plays, 69 yards, 4:24
- LU – 08:16: Griffin, Khalan 32 yd run (Esqueda, Chris kick), TIED 7–7 5 plays, 65 yards, 2:13
- LU – 01:55: Jones, Izaha 3 yd pass from Coleman, Robert (Esqueda, Chris kick) LU 7–14 9 plays, 37 yards, 4:21

Second Quarter

- LU – 11:05: Coleman, Robert 9 yd run (Esqueda, Chris kick), LU 7–21 10 plays, 62 yards, 4:27
- LU – 00:45: Harris, Damashja 2 yd run (Esqueda, Chris kick) LU 7–28 8 plays, 68 yards, 2:35

Third Quarter

- McN – 11:01: Marks, Jihad 14 yd pass from Sixkiller, Kamden (Smith, Garrison kick) LU 14–28 6 plays, 60 yards, 1:54
- LU – 06:00: Gibbs, Devyn 23 yd pass from Coleman, Robert (Esqueda, Chris kick) LU 14–35 5 plays, 38 yards, 1:49
- LU – 05:31: Dennis, Andre 4 yd pass from Coleman, Robert (Esqueda, Chris kick) LU 14–42 1 plays, 19 yards, TOP 00:14
- McN – 3:54: Marks, Jihad 12 yd pass from Sixkiller, Kamden (Smith, Garrison kick) LU 21–42 5 plays, 75 yards, 1:37

Fourth Quarter

- LU – 14:39: Esqueda, Chris 42 yd field goal LU 21–45 10 plays, 45 yards, TOP 04:07
- McN – 10:53: Durham, D'Angelo 1 yd run ( ), LU 27–45 9 plays, 75 yards, TOP 03:46
- LU – 6:40: Harris, Damashja 19 yd run (Esqueda, Chris kick) LU 27–52 7 plays, 60 yards, TOP 04:05

| Statistics | McN | LU |
|---|---|---|
| First downs | 10 | 24 |
| Plays–yards | 64–397 | 70–387 |
| Rushes–yards | 33–187 | 53–255 |
| Passing yards | 210 | 132 |
| Passing: comp–att–int | 17–31–2 | 12–17–0 |
| Time of possession | 25:18 | 34:42 |

| Team | Category | Player | Statistics |
|---|---|---|---|
| McNeese | Passing | Kamden Sixkiller | 16/29-2; total 206 yds; TDs 3; INT 2; long 39 yds; sack 1 |
| McNeese | Rushing | Joshon Barbie | 22 attempts; gain 138 yds; loss 8 yds; long 60 yds |
| McNeese | Receiving | Jonathan Harris | 4 receptions; 69 total yds; TD 0; long 39 yds |
| Lamar | Passing | Robert Coleman | 12/17-0; 132 total yds; TD 3; long 23 yds; sack 1 |
| Lamar | Rushing | Khalan Griffin | 22 attempts; gained 123 yds; loss 8 yds; long 32; TD 1 |
| Lamar | Receiving | Trae Hall | 3 receptions; 33 yds; long 18 yds |

== Roster ==
2023 Lamar Cardinals football team roster
Players
Coaches
Offense

| Pos. | # | Name | Class |
|---|---|---|---|
| WR | 0 | Daelyn Williams | So |
| WR | 1 | Andre Dennis | So |
| RB | 2 | Damashja Harris | So |
| WR | 3 | Izaha Jones | So |
| WR | 4 | Cameron George | So |
| QB | 5 | Robert Coleman | Jr |
| RB | 6 | Khalin Griffin | Jr |
| WR | 7 | Sevonne Rhea | So |
| WR | 8 | Kyndon Fuselier | So |
| QB | 9 | Mike Chandler | So |
| QB | 10 | Jakolby Longino | So |
| TE | 11 | Nathan Gaskamp | Sr |
| WR | 12 | Jordan Wallace | Jr |
| WR | 13 | Jayden Boyd | Fr |
| QB | 14 | Aiden McCown | Fr |
| QB | 16 | Kendric Malone | Fr |
| WR | 17 | Vontravius Hall | Sr |
| TE | 18 | Shaun Grayson | Jr |
| WR | 19 | Joe Bryant | Fr |
| RB | 20 | Major Bowden | So |
| RB | 24 | R J Carver | So |
| RB | 26 | Dorian Manuel | Jr |
| RB | 38 | Deshaun Brundage | Fr |
| RB | 40 | Rashaad Johnson | Fr |
| OL | 51 | Donovan Jordan | Fr |
| OL | 58 | Elias Ripley | Jr |
| OL | 60 | John Hester | Fr |
| OL | 61 | Kade Verden | Fr |
| OL | 62 | Devin Fregia | So |
| OL | 64 | Bryce Loftin | Fr |
| OL | 65 | Jacob Dicharry | Jr |
| OL | 66 | Chandler White | Fr |
| OL | 67 | Marcus Harbert | Fr |
| OL | 68 | Reese Osei-Wusu | Fr |
| OL | 69 | Zachary Curtis | Fr |
| OL | 70 | Preston Yarber | Fr |
| OL | 71 | Jevale Roberson | Jr |
| OL | 72 | Marques Mayo | So |
| OL | 73 | Kortez Winslow | Fr |
| OL | 74 | Knox Boyd | Fr |
| OL | 75 | B.J. Williams | So |
| OL | 76 | Thomas Le Boucher | Jr |
| OL | 77 | Reginald Burks | Fr |
| OL | 78 | Devon King | Jr |
| OL | 79 | Reggie Brooks | So |
| WR | 80 | Carter Holmes | Fr |
| TE | 81 | Devyn Gibbs | So |
| WR | 82 | Michael Everett | Fr |
| TE | 83 | Iyioluwa Adekoya | Fr |
| TE | 84 | Sterling Herrington | So |
| WR | 85 | Michael Vasquez | Fr |
| TE | 86 | Brian Shearer | Jr |
| TE | 88 | Morgan Sampson | Fr |
| TE | 89 | JaCorey Hyder | So |

Defense

| Pos. | # | Name | Class |
|---|---|---|---|
| LB | 0 | Jalen Freeman | Jr |
| DB | 1 | Kristian Pugh | So |
| DB | 2 | Josh Landrum | Jr |
| DB | 3 | Ramond Stevens | Jr |
| DE | 4 | Jaymond Jackson | Jr |
| DB | 5 | Damian Alexander | Jr |
| LB | 6 | Foday Jalloh | Sr |
| DB | 7 | Kevin Anderson | So |
| LB | 8 | Vencent Rockwell | Jr |
| DB | 9 | Joshua Ofili | Sr |
| LB | 10 | Jase Williams | So |
| DB | 11 | Canden Grogan | So |
| DB | 12 | Antorius Hambric, Jr. | Jr |
| DB | 13 | Andrew Hardin | So |
| DB | 14 | Dwight Davis | Fr |
| LB | 15 | Ken Savanah | Jr |
| LB | 16 | Codey Martin | So |
| LB | 17 | Brayden Faulkner | So |
| DB | 18 | KJ Gilbert | So |
| LB | 19 | Joey Johnson | Jr |
| DB | 20 | Kybo Jamerson | So |
| LB | 21 | Jamarion Evans | Fr |
| DB | 22 | Jaden Hardin | So |
| DB | 23 | Tre Turner | Fr |
| LB | 25 | Jonavon Tillis | So |
| LB | 27 | Robert Bonar | So |
| DB | 29 | Kameron Griffin | Fr |
| DB | 30 | Du'Wayne Paulhill, Jr | So |
| DB | 31 | Brenden Bradshaw | Fr |
| DB | 33 | Samuel Scaife IV | Jr |
| LB | 34 | Ian Box | Fr |
| DE | 35 | Royce Maloles | Fr |
| DB | 36 | Isaiah Grant | So |
| DB | 39 | Javon Rhodes | Fr |
| LB | 40 | Jalen Freeman | Jr |
| DL | 41 | Siale Suliafu | So |
| DE | 42 | Jacob Ferree | Fr |
| DS | 43 | Bo Dawson | Fr |
| LB | 44 | Oliver Jack | So |
| DE | 45 | Kei'Trone Simpson | Fr |
| DB | 47 | DJ Wilson | Jr |
| DE | 48 | Pius Njenge | Jr |
| DB | 49 | Anthony White | Fr |
| LB | 50 | Royce Carver | Fr |
| LB | 52 | Blake Gotcher | Jr |
| LB | 53 | Jayron Williams | Fr |
| LB | 55 | Koda Canady | Fr |
| DL | 56 | James Perkins | So |
| DL | 57 | Jonovan Dennis | Fr |
| DL | 79 | Reggie Brooks | So |
| DL | 90 | Jayden Madkins | Fr |
| DL | 91 | Alex Sumler | Fr |
| DL | 92 | Colin Hedges | Fr |
| DL | 93 | Daniel Obinna-Kanu | Fr |
| DL | 95 | Mahki Reed | Fr |
| DL | 96 | Khai Mcghee | Fr |
| DE | 97 | Alex Haralson | Fr |
| DL | 98 | Peyton Christian | Fr |
| DL | 99 | Caleb Williams | Jr |

Special teams

| Pos. | # | Name | Class |
|---|---|---|---|
| K | 31 | Dawson Schremp | Fr |
| K/P | 32 | Chris Esqueda | Jr |
| K/P | 37 | Westin Waters | Fr |
| DS | 43 | Beau Dawson | Fr |
| K | 46 | Alfonso Deleon | Sr |
| DS | 54 | Lane Gilchrist | Jr |
| K/P | 94 | Ben Woodard | So |

Head coach

Pete Rossomando

Coordinators/assistant coaches

- Drew Christ, Def Coord
- Will Fleming, Off Coord and QBs
- Coby Gipson, Recruiting coord and RBs
- Daryl Daleen, Co-Special teams coordinator and ILBs
- Dave Stedman, Co-Special teams coordinator and OLB's
- Wayne Cordova, Safeties
- Lorenzo Jackson, DLs
- Matt Cannata, OL
- Todd Macon, Running backs
- Andrew Sparano, Tight ends
- Pat Walker, Strength

Legend

- (C) Team captain
- (S) Suspended
- (I) Ineligible
- Injured
- Redshirt

Roster
Last update: September 2, 2023

== Awards and honors ==
Damashjah Harris was named as the Dave Campbell's Texas Football Non-FBS Special Teams Player of the Year.

=== Conference awards and honors ===
==== Weekly awards ====
Cardinals were recognized six times as conference players of the week.

Weekly honors
| Honors | Player | Position | Date Awarded | Ref. |
|---|---|---|---|---|
| SLC Offensive Player of the Week | Robert Coleman | QB | October 2, 2023 | |
| SLC Special Teams Player of the Week | Damashja Harris | KR | October 9, 2023 | |
| SLC Offensive Player of the Week | Sevonne Rhea | WR | October 16, 2023 | |
| SLC Special Teams Player of the Week | Alphonso Deleon | P | October 30, 2023 | |
| SLC Special Teams Player of the Week | Damien Alexander | DB | November 6, 2023 | |
| SLC Special Teams Player of the Week | Ramond Stevens | DB | November 13, 2023 | |

==== All–Southland ====
The Southland Conference announced the 2023 all-conference football team selections on November 22, 2023. Lamar had a total of 6 players selected.

Offense

2nd Team

- Khalan Griffin – running back, JR
- Jevale Roberson – offensive line, JR
- Elias Ripley – offensive line, JR

Defense

1st Team

- Damashja Harris – kick returner, SO

2nd Team

- Caleb Williams – defensive lineman, JR
- Joshua Ofili – defensive back, SR
