= 1957 Louisiana Tech Bulldogs football team =

American college football season

1957 Louisiana Tech Bulldogs football

GSC co-champion
- Conference: Gulf States Conference
- Record: 6–4 (4–1 GSC)
- Head coach: Joe Aillet (17th season)
- Captains: Billy Bond; Tom Hinton
- Home stadium: Tech Stadium

1957 Gulf States Conference football standings
	Conf.					Overall
Team	W		L		T	W		L		T
McNeese State +	4	–	1	–	0	8	–	2	–	0
Northwestern State +	4	–	1	–	0	7	–	2	–	0
Louisiana Tech +	4	–	1	–	0	6	–	4	–	0
Southwestern Louisiana	1	–	3	–	1	4	–	5	–	1
Southeastern Louisiana	1	–	3	–	1	2	–	6	–	1
Northeast Louisiana State	0	–	5	–	0	2	–	6	–	0
+ – Conference co-champions

The 1957 Louisiana Tech Bulldogs football team was an American football team that represented the Louisiana Polytechnic Institute (now known as Louisiana Tech University) as a member of the Gulf States Conference during the 1957 college football season. In their seventeenth year under head coach Joe Aillet, the team compiled a 6–4 record and finished as Gulf States Conference champion.

== Schedule ==
Date	Opponent	Site	Result	Attendance	Source
September 21	Mississippi Southern*	Tech Stadium; Ruston, LA (rivalry)	L 0–7	7,500	
September 28	at Stephen F. Austin*	Nacogdoches, TX	W 19–13		
October 5	at McNeese State	Wildcat Stadium; Lake Charles, LA	L 6–13		
October 12	Southwestern Louisiana	Tech Stadium; Ruston, LA (rivalry)	W 28–13	7,000	
October 19	vs. Northwestern State	State Fair Stadium; Shreveport, LA (rivalry)	W 20–13		
October 26	Arkansas State*	Tech Stadium; Ruston, LA	W 25–19		
November 2	at McMurry*	Indian Stadium; Abilene, TX	L 24–26	2,500	
November 9	at Southeastern Louisiana	Strawberry Stadium; Hammond, LA	W 21–14		
November 16	Memphis State*^{†}	Tech Stadium; Ruston, LA	L 7–17		
November 23	Northeast Louisiana State	Tech Stadium; Ruston, LA (rivalry)	W 15–6		
*Non-conference game; ^{†}Homecoming
