= 2023 Southeastern Louisiana Lions football team =

American college football season

2023 Southeastern Louisiana Lions football
- Conference: Southland Conference
- Record: 3–8 (3–4 Southland)
- Head coach: Frank Scelfo (6th season)
- Offensive coordinator: Greg Stevens (8th season)
- Defensive coordinator: Bill D'Ottavio (2nd season)
- Home stadium: Strawberry Stadium

2023 Southland Conference football standings
	Conf.			Overall
Team	W		L	W		L
Nicholls $^	7	–	0	6	–	5
No. 22 Incarnate Word	6	–	1	8	–	2
Lamar	5	–	2	6	–	5
Houston Christian	4	–	3	5	–	5
Southeastern Louisiana	3	–	4	3	–	8
Texas A&M–Commerce *	2	–	5	1	–	9
McNeese	1	–	6	0	–	10
Northwestern State **	0	–	2	0	–	6
$ – Conference champion; ^ – FCS playoff participant; * – Texas A&M–Commerce ineligible for FCS postseason play due to transition from NCAA Division II. ** – Northwestern State canceled its season on October 26.; Rankings from STATS Poll

The 2023 Southeastern Louisiana Lions football team represented Southeastern Louisiana University as a member of the Southland Conference during the 2023 NCAA Division I FCS football season. They were led by sixth-year head coach Frank Scelfo. The Lions played their home games at Strawberry Stadium in Hammond, Louisiana.

== Preseason ==
=== Recruiting class ===
College recruiting (2023)
Name	Hometown	School	Height	Weight	40^{‡}	Commit date
Peyton Anderson; DL	St. Amant, LA	St. Amant HS	6 ft 3 in (1.91 m)	240 lb (110 kg)	-	
Peyton Anderson; DL	Recruit ratings: No ratings found					
Colin Boldt; LB	Baton Rouge, LA	Dunham HS	6 ft 2 in (1.88 m)	190 lb (86 kg)	-	
Colin Boldt; LB	Recruit ratings: No ratings found					
Rodney Brown Jr. DB	Kentwood, LA	Jewel Sumner HS	6 ft 1 in (1.85 m)	185 lb (84 kg)	-	
Rodney Brown Jr. DB	Recruit ratings: No ratings found					
Donovan Bynum; DB	Houston, TX	Langham Creek HS	6 ft 0 in (1.83 m)	180 lb (82 kg)	-	
Donovan Bynum; DB	Recruit ratings: No ratings found					
Tylon Cooper; DB	Eunice, LA	Eunice HS	6 ft 0 in (1.83 m)	160 lb (73 kg)	-	
Tylon Cooper; DB	Recruit ratings: No ratings found					
Dorian Davis; DL	White Castle, LA	White Castle	6 ft 5 in (1.96 m)	250 lb (110 kg)	-	
Dorian Davis; DL	Recruit ratings: No ratings found					
Jaylon Domingeaux; WR	Lafayette, LA	Comeaux HS	6 ft 2 in (1.88 m)	175 lb (79 kg)	-	
Jaylon Domingeaux; WR	Recruit ratings: No ratings found					
Khamron Ford; LB	Olive Branch, MS	Olive Branch HS; Northwest Mississippi CC	5 ft 11 in (1.80 m)	200 lb (91 kg)	-	
Khamron Ford; LB	Recruit ratings: No ratings found					
Tristan Goodly; WR	Westlake, LA	Westlake HS	6 ft 0 in (1.83 m)	170 lb (77 kg)	-	
Tristan Goodly; WR	Recruit ratings: No ratings found					
Lemar Harris; ATH	Amite, LA	Amite HS	6 ft 3 in (1.91 m)	205 lb (93 kg)	-	
Lemar Harris; ATH	Recruit ratings: No ratings found					
Deantre Jackson; RB	New Orleans, LA	Edna Karr HS	5 ft 8 in (1.73 m)	180 lb (82 kg)	-	
Deantre Jackson; RB	Recruit ratings: No ratings found					
Jirrea Johnson; LB	New Orleans, LA	Warren Easton HS	5 ft 11 in (1.80 m)	220 lb (100 kg)	-	
Jirrea Johnson; LB	Recruit ratings: No ratings found					
Wayne McKinney III; OL	Geismar, LA	Dutchtown HS	6 ft 3 in (1.91 m)	290 lb (130 kg)	-	
Wayne McKinney III; OL	Recruit ratings: No ratings found					
Mike Mitchell; DB	Plaquemine, LA	Plaquemine HS	5 ft 11 in (1.80 m)	180 lb (82 kg)	-	
Mike Mitchell; DB	Recruit ratings: No ratings found					
Jordan Okoye; LB	Baton Rouge, LA	Liberty Magnet HS	6 ft 1 in (1.85 m)	225 lb (102 kg)	-	
Jordan Okoye; LB	Recruit ratings: No ratings found					
Ilias Rida; OL	Hamburg, Germany	St. Stanislaus HS	6 ft 7 in (2.01 m)	270 lb (120 kg)	-	
Ilias Rida; OL	Recruit ratings: No ratings found					
Javen Sanchez; DL	Houston, TX	Dobie HS; Tyler JC	6 ft 1 in (1.85 m)	280 lb (130 kg)	-	
Javen Sanchez; DL	Recruit ratings: No ratings found					
Brandon Spincer Jr. OL	New Orleans, LA	Edna Karr HS	6 ft 2 in (1.88 m)	275 lb (125 kg)	-	
Brandon Spincer Jr. OL	Recruit ratings: No ratings found					
Riley Whitten; OL	Belle Chasse, LA	Belle Chasse HS	6 ft 2 in (1.88 m)	275 lb (125 kg)	-	
Riley Whitten; OL	Recruit ratings: No ratings found					
Mike Williams; WR	Marrero, LA	Archbishop Shaw HS	5 ft 11 in (1.80 m)	170 lb (77 kg)	-	
Mike Williams; WR	Recruit ratings: No ratings found					

=== Preseason poll ===
The Southland Conference released their preseason poll on July 24, 2023. The Lions were picked to finish first in the conference and received nine first-place votes.

=== Preseason All–Southland Teams ===
The Southland Conference announced the 2023 preseason all-conference football team selections on July 21, 2023. SELU had a total of 17 players selected.

Offense

1st Team

- Zachary Clement – quarterback, JR
- John Allen – offensive lineman, SR
- Jhy Orgeron – offensive lineman, JR
- Jalen Bell – offensive lineman, SR
- Austin Dunlap – punter, SR

2nd Team

- Eli Sawyer – quarterback, RS-SO
- Rodeo Graham, Jr. – running back, SO
- Ivan Drobocky – tight end/halfback, JR
- Brockhim Wicks – offensive lineman, RS-JR
- Riley Callaghan – placekicker, SO

Defense

1st Team

- Arlen Williams – defensive lineman, RS-SR
- Donte' Daniels – linebacker, JR
- Darius Lewis – punt returner, RS-JR

2nd Team

- Garret Crawford – defensive lineman, SR
- Herman Christophe IV – linebacker, SR
- Anthony Britton, Jr. – linebacker, SR
- Tyrone Leggette – defensive back, SR

== Schedule ==
Date	Time	Opponent	Rank	Site	TV	Result	Attendance
September 2	3:00 p.m.	at Mississippi State*	No. 15	Davis Wade Stadium; Starkville, MS	SECN	L 7–48	50,041
September 9	4:00 p.m.	at South Alabama*	No. 16	Hancock Whitney Stadium; Mobile, AL	ESPN+	L 17–35	15,237
September 16	3:00 p.m.	at Eastern Washington*	No. 19	Roos Field; Cheney, WA	ESPN+	L 29–40	4,103
September 23	6:00 p.m.	Houston Christian		Strawberry Stadium; Hammond, LA	ESPN+	L 19–34	3,694
September 30	3:00 p.m.	Tarleton State*		Strawberry Stadium; Hammond, LA	ESPN+	L 13–14	3,249
October 7	4:00 p.m.	at No. 8 Incarnate Word		Gayle and Tom Benson Stadium; San Antonio, TX	ESPN+	L 26–33	1,622
October 14	3:00 p.m.	Lamar^{†}		Strawberry Stadium; Hammond, LA	ESPN+	L 24–30	4,152
October 19	7:00 p.m.	at Northwestern State		Harry Turpin Stadium; Natchitoches, LA (rivlary)	ESPN+	W 37–20	2,237
November 4	3:00 p.m.	McNeese		Strawberry Stadium; Hammond, LA	ESPN+	W 38–24	3,228
November 11	3:30 p.m.	at Texas A&M–Commerce		Ernest Hawkins Field at Memorial Stadium; Commerce, TX	ESPN+	W 52–14	4,387
November 16	6:00 p.m.	Nicholls		Strawberry Stadium; Hammond, LA (River Bell Classic)	ESPN+	L 16–21	5,398
*Non-conference game; ^{†}Homecoming; Rankings from STATS Poll released prior to the game; All times are in Central time

== Game summaries ==
=== at Mississippi State ===
Game One – No. 15 Southeastern Louisiana Lions (0–0) vs Mississippi State Bulldogs (FBS) (0–0)

Quarter	1	2	3	4	Total
No. 15 Southeastern Louisiana	0	7	0	0	7
Mississippi State (FBS)	3	17	7	21	48

at Davis Wade Stadium • Starkville, Mississippi

- Date: Saturday, September 2, 2023
- Game time: 3:00 p.m. CDT
- Game weather: Cloudy • Temperature: 78 °F (26 °C) • Wind: SE 8 mph
- Game attendance: 50,041
- Referee: Steve Marlowe
- TV announcers (SECN): Taylor Zarzour (play-by-play), Matt Stinchcomb (analyst), Alyssa Lang (sideline)

Game information

First quarter

- (4:02) MSST – Kyle Ferrie 47-yard field goal (Drive: 12 plays, 56 yards, 5:07; Mississippi State 3-0)

Second quarter

- (13:46) MSST – Jo'quavious Marks 1-yard run (Kyle Ferrie kick) (Drive: 3 plays, 36 yards, 1:06; Mississippi State 10-0)
- (5:32) SELA – Jacob Logan 2-yard pass from Zachary Clement (Riley Callaghan kick) (Drive: 16 plays, 79 yards, 8:09; Mississippi State 10-7)
- (1:29) MSST – Creed Whittemore 33-yard pass from Will Rogers (Kyle Ferrie kick) (Drive: 10 plays, 75 yards, 4:03; Mississippi State 17-7)
- (0:00) MSST – Kyle Ferrie 49-yard field goal (Drive: 6 plays, 29 yards, 0:44; Mississippi State 20-7)

Third quarter

- (1:30) MSST – Jaden Walley 5-yard pass from Will Rogers (Kyle Ferrie kick) (Drive: 6 plays, 82 yards, 3:29; Mississippi State 27-7)

Fourth quarter

- (14:53) MSST – Avery Sledge 11-yard punt return (Kyle Ferrie kick) (Mississippi State 34-7)
- (9:20) MSST – Jo'Quavious Marks 6-yard run (Kyle Ferrie kick) (Drive: 6 plays, 85 yards, 3:05; Mississippi State 41-7)
- (5:19) MSST – Creed Whittemore 53-yard run (Kyle Ferrie kick) (Drive: 4 plays, 72 yards, 2:10; Mississippi State 48-7)

Statistics	SELA	MSST
First downs	10	23
Total yards	54–208	68–525
Rushing yards	26–83	39–298
Passing yards	125	227
Passing: Comp–Att–Int	16–28–0	20–29–0
Time of possession	28:58	31:02

Team	Category	Player	Statistics
Southeastern Louisiana	Passing	Eli Sawyer	11/19, 85 yards
Southeastern Louisiana	Rushing	Harlan Dixon	8 carries, 51 yards
Southeastern Louisiana	Receiving	Harlan Dixon	4 receptions, 42 yards
Mississippi State	Passing	Will Rogers	20/29, 227 yards, 2 TD
Mississippi State	Rushing	Jo'Quavious Marks	19 carries, 127 yards, 2 TD
Mississippi State	Receiving	Creed Whittemore	4 receptions, 59 yards, TD

=== At South Alabama ===
Game Two – No. 16 Southeastern Louisiana Lions (0–1) vs South Alabama Jaguars (0–1)

Quarter	1	2	3	4	Total
No. 16 Lions	0	7	0	10	17
Jaguars	0	7	14	14	35

at Hancock Whitney Stadium • Mobile, Alabama

- Date: Saturday, September 9, 2023
- Game time: 4:00 p.m. CDT
- Game weather: Sunny • Temperature: 92 °F (33 °C) • Wind: S 4 mph
- Game attendance: 15,237
- Referee: Trennis Livingston
- TV announcers (ESPN+): JD Byars (play-by-play) and Pat Greenwood (analyst)

Game information

First Quarter

None

Second Quarter

- (5:26) SLU – Ivan Drobocky 4-yard pass from Zachary Clement, Riley Callaghan kick (Drive: 12 plays, 93 yards, 7:18; Southeastern Louisiana 7–0)
- (4:02) USA – La'Damian Webb 2-yard run, Jacob Meeks kick (Drive: 4 plays, 75 yards, 1:23; Tied 7–7)

Third Quarter

- (8:50) USA – La'Damian Webb 13-yard run, Jacob Meeks kick (Drive: 7 plays, 74 yards, 3:10; South Alabama 14–7)
- (3:52) USA – Kentrel Bullock 8-yard run, Diego Guajardo kick (Drive: 9 plays, 61 yards, 3:52; South Alabama 21–7)

Fourth Quarter

- (14:44) USA – Caullin Lacy 84-yard pass from Carter Bradley, Diego Guajardo kick (Drive: 3 plays, 89 yards, 1:11; South Alabama 28–7)
- (12:09) SLU – Riley Callaghan 29-yard field goal (Drive: 5 plays, 76 yards, 2:28; South Alabama 28–10)
- (3:28) USA – Marco Lee Jr. 13-yard run, Diego Guajardo kick (Drive: 14 plays, 75 yards, 8:41; South Alabama 35–10)
- (0:41) SLU – Harlan Dixon 1-yard run, Riley Callaghan kick (Drive: 8 plays, 80 yards, 2:37; South Alabama 35–17)

Statistics	SELA	USA
First downs	20	23
Plays–yards	412	509
Rushes–yards	26–62	35–248
Passing yards	350	261
Passing: comp–att–int	25–36–1	20–27–1
Turnovers		
Time of possession	31:51	28:09

Team	Category	Player	Statistics
Southeastern Louisiana	Passing	Zachary Clement	18/24, 267 yards, TD, INT
Southeastern Louisiana	Rushing	Rodeo Graham Jr.	8 carries, 33 yards
Southeastern Louisiana	Receiving	Darius Lewis	7 receptions, 81 yards
South Alabama	Passing	Carter Bradley	19/26, 258 yards, TD, INT
South Alabama	Rushing	Kentrel Bullock	14 carries, 82 yards, TD
South Alabama	Receiving	Caullin Lacy	8 receptions, 139 yards, TD

=== At Eastern Washington ===
Game Three – Southeastern Louisiana Lions (0–2) vs Eastern Washington Eagles (0–2)

Quarter	1	2	3	4	Total
No. 19 Lions	7	7	7	8	29
Eagles	7	10	3	20	40

at Roos Field • Cheney, Washington

- Date: Saturday, September 16, 2023
- Game time: 3:00 p.m. CDT
- Game weather: Sunny • Temperature: 82 °F (28 °C) • Wind: N 4 mph
- Game attendance: 4,103
- Referee: Spencer Mumford
- TV announcers (ESPN+): Dennis Patchin (play-by-play) and Greg Peach (analyst)

Game information

First quarter

- (13:28) SLU – Zachary Clement 7-yard run, Riley Callaghan kick (Drive: 4 plays, 44 yards, 1:22; Southeastern Louisiana 7–0)
- (7:35) EWU – Efton Chism III 3-yard pass from Kekoa Visperas, Soren McKee kick (Drive: 15 plays, 75 yards, 5:53; Tied 7–7)

Second quarter

- (7:35) SLU – Bauer Sharp 3-yard pass from Eli Sawyer, Riley Callaghan kick (Drive: 6 plays, 76 yards, 2:54; Southeastern Louisiana 14–7)
- (7:35) EWU – Soren McKee 26-yard field goal (Drive: 14 plays, 70 yards, 4:58; Southeastern Louisiana 14–10)
- (7:35) EWU – Nolan Ulm 5-yard pass from Kekoa Visperas, Soren McKee kick (Drive: 7 plays, 59 yards, 0:51; Eastern Washington 17–14)

Third quarter

- (6:17) EWU – Soren McKee 39-yard field goal (Drive: 5 plays, 19 yards, 1:42; Eastern Washington 20–14)
- (0:05) SLU – Bauer Sharp 1-yard pass from Zachary Clement, Riley Callaghan kick (Drive: 9 plays, 30 yards, 4:02; Southeastern Louisiana 21–20)

Fourth quarter

- (11:22) EWU – Justice Jackson 7-yard run (Drive: 10 plays, 85 yards, 3:38; Eastern Washington 26–21)
- (5:39) SLU – Jacob Logan 19-yard pass from Zachary Clement, Darius Lewis kick (Drive: 11 plays, 75 yards, 5:43; Southeastern Louisiana 29–26)
- (1:34) EWU – Tuna Altahir 1-yard run, Soren McKee kick (Drive: 10 plays, 75 yards, 4:05; Eastern Washington 33–29)
- (1:26) EWU – Marlon Jones Jr. 34-yard interception, Soren McKee kick (Drive: Eastern Washington 40–29)

Statistics	SELA	EWU
First downs	14	37
Plays–yards	293	530
Rushes–yards	11	11
Passing yards	3	23
Passing: comp–att–int	13–23–1	34–48–1
Turnovers		
Time of possession	25:42	34:18

Team	Category	Player	Statistics
Southeastern Louisiana	Passing	Zachary Clement	10/19, 80 yards, 2 TD, INT
Southeastern Louisiana	Rushing	Harlan Dixon	18 carries, 71 yards
Southeastern Louisiana	Receiving	Darius Lewis	4 receptions, 75 yards
Eastern Washington	Passing	Kekoa Visperas	33/47, 349 yards, 2 TD, INT
Eastern Washington	Rushing	Justice Jackson	12 carries, 91 yards, TD
Eastern Washington	Receiving	Efton Chism III	9 receptions, 103 yards, TD

=== Houston Christian ===
Game Four – Southeastern Louisiana Lions (0–3) vs Houston Christian Huskies (1–2)

Quarter	1	2	Total
Huskies			0
Lions			0

at Strawberry Stadium • Hammond, Louisiana

- Date: Saturday, September 23, 2023
- Game time: 6:00 p.m. CDT
- Game attendance: 3,694
- TV: ESPN+

Game information

First quarter
Second quarter
Third quarter
Fourth quarter

Statistics	HCU	SELA
First downs		
Plays–yards		
Rushes–yards		
Passing yards		
Passing: comp–att–int		
Turnovers		
Time of possession		

Team	Category	Player	Statistics
Houston Christian	Passing		
Houston Christian	Rushing		
Houston Christian	Receiving		
Southeastern Louisiana	Passing		
Southeastern Louisiana	Rushing		
Southeastern Louisiana	Receiving		

=== Tarleton State ===
Game Five – Southeastern Louisiana Lions (0–4) vs Tarleton State Texans (3–1)

Quarter	1	2	Total
Texans			0
Lions			0

at Strawberry Stadium • Hammond, Louisiana

- Date: Saturday, September 30, 2023
- Game time: 3:00 p.m. CDT

Game information

First quarter
Second quarter
Third quarter
Fourth quarter

Statistics	TAR	SELA
First downs		
Plays–yards		
Rushes–yards		
Passing yards		
Passing: comp–att–int		
Turnovers		
Time of possession		

Team	Category	Player	Statistics
Tarleton State	Passing		
Tarleton State	Rushing		
Tarleton State	Receiving		
Southeastern Louisiana	Passing		
Southeastern Louisiana	Rushing		
Southeastern Louisiana	Receiving		

=== At No. 8 Incarnate Word ===
Game Six – Southeastern Louisiana Lions (0–5) vs Incarnate Word Cardinals (3–1)

Quarter	1	2	3	4	Total
Lions	3	3	13	7	26
No. 8 Cardinals	7	17	9	0	33

at Gayle and Tom Benson Stadium • San Antonio, Texas

- Date: Saturday, October 7, 2023
- Game time: 4:00 p.m. CDT
- Game weather: Temperature: 76 • Wind: NE 9 mph • Weather: Cloudy
- Game attendance: 1,622
- Referee: Gary Leeper
- TV: ESPN+

Game information

First quarter
Second quarter
Third quarter
Fourth quarter

Statistics	SELA	UIW
First downs	24	22
Plays–yards	80-416	62-371
Rushes–yards	39-145	29-67
Passing yards	271	304
Passing: comp–att–int	24-41-1	23-33-1
Turnovers		
Time of possession	34:16	21:53

Team	Category	Player	Statistics
Southeastern Louisiana	Passing	Eli Sawyer	27/40, 271 yards, 2 TD, 1 INT
Southeastern Louisiana	Rushing	Harlan Dixon	13 carries, 55 yards
Southeastern Louisiana	Receiving	Jaylon Domingeaux	4 receptions, 58 yards, 1 TD
Incarnate Word	Passing	Zach Calzada	23/32, 304 yards, 2 TD, 1 INT
Incarnate Word	Rushing	Jarrell Wiley	9 carries, 54 yards
Incarnate Word	Receiving	Brandon Porter	10 receptions, 182 yards, 1 TD

=== Lamar ===
Game Seven – Southeastern Louisiana Lions (0–6) vs Lamar Cardinals (3–3)

Quarter	1	2	3	4	Total
Cardinals	10	20	0	0	30
Lions	10	0	7	7	24

at Strawberry Stadium • Hammond, Louisiana

- Date: Saturday, October 14, 2023
- Game time: 3:00 p.m. CDT
- Game weather: Wind: NW 13 - Weather: Sunny - Temp: 78
- Game attendance: 4,152
- Referee: Ed Bourgeois
- TV: ESPN+
- Box Score

Game information

First quarter

- SELA - 12:55 - Callaghan, Riley 31 yd field goal 6 plays SELA 0-3 62 yards, TOP 02:05
- LU - 8:15 - Esqueda, Chris 43 yd field goal SELA 3-3 9 plays, 39 yards, TOP 04:38
- SELA - 5:01 - Lewis, Darius 28 yd pass from Sawyer, Eli (Callaghan, Riley kick) SELA 3-10 6 plays, 75 yards, TOP 03:16
- LU - 2:09 - Gilbert, K.J. 60 yd fumble recovery (Esqueda, Chris kick) SELA 10-10

Second quarter

- LU - 7:23 - Bowden, Major 4 yd run (Esqueda, Chris kick) LU 17-10 7 plays, 51 yards, TOP 02:57
- LU - 2:59 - Rhea, Sevonne 35 yd pass from Coleman, Robert ( ) LU 23-10 7 plays, 74 yards, TOP 03:17
- LU - 1:11 - Rhea, Sevonne 37 yd pass from Coleman, Robert (Esqueda, Chris kick) LU 30-10 1 plays, 37 yards, TOP 00:08

Third quarter

- SELA - 1:44 - Sharp, Bauer 7 yd run (Callaghan, Riley kick) LU 30-17 12 plays, 75 yards, TOP 05:07

Fourth quarter

- SELA - 9:29 - Lewis, Darius 19 yd pass from Clement, Zachary (Callaghan, Riley kick) LU 30-24 8 plays, 70 yards, TOP 03:22

Statistics	LU	SLU
First downs	17	22
Plays–yards	59-359	65-453
Rushes–yards	102	102
Passing yards	257	351
Passing: comp–att–int	17/22-0	21/34-2
Turnovers		
Time of possession	32:26	27:34

Team	Category	Player	Statistics
Lamar	Passing	Robert Coleman	17/22; 257 total yds; long 42; TD 3; sack 3
Lamar	Rushing	Khalan Griffin	23 attempts; gained 74 yds.; lost 3 yds; long 14 yds.
Lamar	Receiving	Sevonne Rhea	6 receptions; total 133 yds; TDs 2; long 37 yds.
Southeastern Louisiana	Passing	Eli Sawyer	9/16; 210 total yds.; long 58 yds; TD 1; Int 2; sack 2
Southeastern Louisiana	Rushing	Zachary Clement	8 attempts; gained 34 yds; lost 1 yd; long 30 yds.
Southeastern Louisiana	Receiving	Xavier Hill	4 receptions; total 106 yds; long 38 yds.

=== At Northwestern State ===
Game Eight – Southeastern Louisiana Lions (0–7) vs Northwestern State Demons (0–5)

Quarter	1	2	3	4	Total
Lions	14	7	13	3	37
Demons	10	7	0	3	20

at Harry Turpin Stadium • Natchitoches, Louisiana

- Date: Thursday, October 19, 2023
- Game time: 7:00 p.m. CDT
- Game weather: Clear, 76 °F (24 °C)
- Game attendance: 2,237
- Referee: Matt Back
- TV: ESPN+

Game information
First quarter
- SELA – Bauer Sharp 1-yard run (Riley Callaghan kick), 12:26. Lions 7–0. Drive: 6 plays, 75 yards, 2:34.
- NWST – Tyler Vander Waal 2-yard run (Brett Money kick), 9:09. Tied 7–7. Drive: 9 plays, 75 yards, 3:17.
- SELA – Da'shun Hugley 22-yard run (Riley Callaghan kick), 6:33. Lions 14–7. Drive: 7 plays, 82 yards, 2:31.
- NWST – Brett Money 38-yard field goal, 0:12. Lions 14–10. Drive: 8 plays, 68 yards, 4:12.

Second quarter

- NWST – Stanley King 29-yard pass from Tyler Vander Waal (Brett Money kick), 13:16. Demons 17–14. Drive: 3 plays, 33 yards, 1:01.
- SELA – Zachary Clement 4-yard run (Riley Callaghan kick), 8:39. Lions 21–17. Drive: 8 plays, 51 yards, 4:28.

Third quarter

- SELA – Victor Tademy 58-yard interception return (Riley Callaghan kick), 13:33. Lions 28–17.
- SELA – Deantre Jackson 81-yard run (kick blocked), 7:50. Lions 34–17. Drive: 4 plays, 93 yards, 1:22.

Fourth quarter

- NWST – Brett Money 22-yard field goal, 14:15. Lions 34–20. Drive: 6 plays, 14 yards, 1:57.
- SELA – Riley Callaghan 30-yard field goal, 10:28. Lions 37–20. Drive: 7 plays, 46 yards, 3:46.

Statistics	SELA	NWST
First downs	18	25
Plays–yards	539	396
Rushes–yards	219	97
Passing yards	320	299
Passing: comp–att–int	18–29–1	31–47–2
Turnovers		
Time of possession	28:42	31:18

Team	Category	Player	Statistics
Southeastern Louisiana	Passing	Zachary Clement	12/18, 192 yards, INT
Southeastern Louisiana	Rushing	Deantre Jackson	6 rushes, 119 yards, TD
Southeastern Louisiana	Receiving	Darius Lewis	6 receptions, 109 yards
Northwestern State	Passing	Tyler Vander Waal	27/43, 249 yards, TD, 2 INT
Northwestern State	Rushing	Kolbe Burrell	11 rushes, 49 yards
Northwestern State	Receiving	T. J. Johnson	3 receptions, 57 yards

=== McNeese State ===
Game Nine – Southeastern Louisiana Lions (1–7) vs McNeese Cowboys (0–7)

Quarter	1	2	Total
Cowboys			0
Lions			0

at Strawberry Stadium • Hammond, Louisiana

- Date: Saturday, November 4, 2023
- Game time: 3:00 p.m. CDT

Game information

First quarter
Second quarter
Third quarter
Fourth quarter

Statistics	MCN	SELA
First downs		
Plays–yards		
Rushes–yards		
Passing yards		
Passing: comp–att–int		
Turnovers		
Time of possession		

Team	Category	Player	Statistics
McNeese	Passing		
McNeese	Rushing		
McNeese	Receiving		
Southeastern Louisiana	Passing		
Southeastern Louisiana	Rushing		
Southeastern Louisiana	Receiving		

=== At Texas A&M–Commerce ===
Game Ten – Southeastern Louisiana Lions (2–7) vs Texas A&M–Commerce Lions (1–8)

Quarter	1	2	Total
Lions (SLU)			0
Lions (TAMUC)			0

at Memorial Stadium • Commerce, Texas

- Date: Saturday, November 11, 2023
- Game time: 3:30 p.m. CST

Game information

First quarter
Second quarter
Third quarter
Fourth quarter

Statistics	SELA	TAMC
First downs		
Plays–yards		
Rushes–yards		
Passing yards		
Passing: comp–att–int		
Turnovers		
Time of possession		

Team	Category	Player	Statistics
Southeastern Louisiana	Passing		
Southeastern Louisiana	Rushing		
Southeastern Louisiana	Receiving		
Texas A&M–Commerce	Passing		
Texas A&M–Commerce	Rushing		
Texas A&M–Commerce	Receiving		

=== Nicholls ===
Game Eleven – Southeastern Louisiana Lions (3–7) vs Nicholls Colonels (6–4)

Quarter	1	2	3	4	Total
Colonels	0	14	7	0	21
Lions	7	6	3	0	16

at Strawberry Stadium • Hammond, Louisiana

- Date: Thursday, November 16, 2023
- Game time: 6:00 p.m. CST
- Game weather: Wind: NE 0 mph - Weather: Cloudy - Temp: 66
- Game attendance: 5,398
- Referee: Ed Bourgeois
- TV: ESPN+
- Box Score

Game information

First Quarter

- SLU – 09:49: Dumas, Justin 6 yd run (Callaghan, Riley kick)
  SLU 0–7 8 plays, 47 yards, TOP 03:10

Second Quarter

- NIC – 14:28: McQuaide, Pat 3 yd run (Lasseigne, Gavin kick)
  TIED 7–7 12 plays, 69 yards, TOP 05:21
- NIC – 08:17: Robinson, David 78 yd pass from McQuaide, Pat (Lasseigne, Gavin kick)
  NIC 14–7 4 plays, 91 yards, TOP 02:47
- SLU – 02:53: Callaghan, Riley 31 yd field goal
  NIC 14–10 11 plays, 64 yards, TOP 05:19
- SLU – 00:10: Callaghan, Riley 26 yd field goal
  NIC 14–13 9 plays, 50 yards, TOP 01:31

Third Quarter

- NIC – 11:40: Spears, Jaylon 73 yd pass from McQuaide, Pat (Lasseigne, Gavin kick)
  NIC 21–13 5 plays, 85 yards, TOP 02:43
- SLU – 01:15: Callaghan, Riley 36 yd field goal
  NIC 21–16 5 plays, 27 yards, TOP 02:23

Fourth Quarter

Statistics	NIC	SELA
First downs	16	18
Plays–yards	59-392	65-218
Rushes–yards	33-89	37-113
Passing yards	303	105
Passing: comp–att–int	21-26-1	13-28-0
Turnovers		
Time of possession	30:59	29:01

Team	Category	Player	Statistics
Nicholls	Passing	Pat McQuaide	20/25-1; 300 yds; 78 yds long; TDs 2; INT 1; sacks 2
Nicholls	Rushing	Jaylon Spears	14 attempts; 65 yds gain; 7 yds loss; 28 yds long;
Nicholls	Receiving	David Robinson	4 receptions; 91 yds; 78 yds long; TD 1;
Southeastern Louisiana	Passing	Zachary Clement	12/25; 98 yds; 23 yds long
Southeastern Louisiana	Rushing	Rodeo Graham, Jr.	11 attempts; 58 yds gain; 15 yds long;
Southeastern Louisiana	Receiving	Xavier Hill	3 receptions; 52 yds; 23 yds long

== Personnel ==
=== Coaching staff ===
Name	Position
Frank Scelfo	Head coach
Greg Stevens	Offensive coordinator / quarterbacks coach
A.J. Hopp	Offensive line coach / run game coordinator
Anthony Scelfo	Wide receivers coach / recruiting coordinator / pass coordinator
Albert Poree	Running backs coach
Ross Jenkins	Tight ends coach / special teams coordinator
Bill D'Ottavio	Defensive coordinator / safeties coach
Del Lee-Collins	Cornerbacks coach
Antonio Baker	Nickelbacks coach
Dustin Landry	Linebackers coach
Tom Rinaldi	Defensive line coach
Bryce Rivers	Offensive analyst
Trey Nunez	Defensive analyst
Luke Wagner	Offensive analyst / offensive line coach

=== Roster ===
2023 Southeastern Louisiana Lions Football
Quarterbacks: 11 – Nolan Tribble – freshman (6'0, 170); 12 – Cammon Cooper – senior (6'5, 210); 13 – Zachary Clement – junior (6'0, 220); 14 – Casey Avrard – freshman (6'2, 205); 17 – Eli Sawyer – (redshirt) sophomore (6'2, 230); Running backs: 3 – Harlan Dixon – junior (6'1, 210); 8 – Rodeo Graham Jr. – sophomore (6'0, 205); 24 – Cyrus Zuell – junior (6'1, 210); 28 – Deantre Jackson – freshman (5'8, 175); 30 – Boogie Childs – (redshirt) freshman (5'10, 200); 34 – Tommy Lee – junior (5'11, 215); Wide receivers: 9 – Darius Lewis – (redshirt) junior (5'8, 150); 10 – Maurice Massey – (redshirt) sophomore (6'4, 200); 12 – Jaylon Domingeaux – freshman (6'2, 195); 16 – Xavier Hill – junior (6'2, 200); 25 – Jason Malbrue – (redshirt) freshman (6'5, 210); 80 – Da'shun Hugley – (redshirt) sophomore (6'1, 185); 81 – Marcellus Johnson – (redshirt) junior (6'3, 215); 82 – Corey Lorio – (redshirt) sophomore (5'10, 170); 83 – Tristan Goodly – freshman (6'0, 170); 84 – Jett Booker – (redshirt) sophomore (5'11, 195); 84 – Clayton Lonardo – freshman (6'3, 210); 85 – Kody Finley – (redshirt) freshman (6'5, 190); 86 – Mike Williams – freshman (5'11, 170); 87 – Demarea Johnson-Cooper – junior (6'0, 185)	Tight ends: 5 – Bauer Sharp – (redshirt) sophomore (6'5, 245); 15 – Jacob Logan – (redshirt) senior (6'3, 240); 38 – Ivan Drobocky – junior (6'4, 240); 40 – Chris Baxter – freshman (6'2, 225); 44 – Connor Briggs – (redshirt) sophomore (6'2, 255); 89 – Cade Collier – (redshirt) sophomore (6'6, 245); Offensive linemen: 51 – Breland Curry – sophomore (6'2, 295); 52 – Noah Devlin – (redshirt) sophomore (6'3, 300); 54 – Brockhim Wicks – (redshirt) junior (6'2, 295); 55 – John Allen – senior (6'1, 310); 56 – Javin Turner – (redshirt) sophomore (6'2, 280); 60 – Ilias Rida – freshman (6'7, 270); 61 – Holden Kareokowsky – (redshirt) sophomore (6'3, 305); 62 – William Granville – (redshirt) junior (5'11, 290); 63 – Corin Boudreaux – freshman (6'1, 300); 65 – Riley Whitten – freshman (6'2, 285); 72 – Brennan Lanclos – (redshirt) junior (6'7, 290); 73 – Jhy Orgeron – junior (6'4, 285); 74 – Jalen Bell – senior (6'5, 300); 75 – Blakley Miller – (redshirt) sophomore (6'5, 300); 76 – Wayne McKinney III – freshman (6'3, 250); 77 – Brandon Spincer Jr. – freshman (6'2, 295); 78 – Logan Potter – (redshirt) freshman (6'5, 330); 79 – Ahmad Bradley – junior (6'3, 320)	Defensive linemen: 7 – Arlen Williams – (redshirt) senior (6'1, 210); 34 – Gerald Henderson – (redshirt) junior (6'3, 220); 42 – Shemar Pearl – (redshirt) junior (6'6, 255); 45 – Garrett Crawford – senior (6'1, 240); 46 – Joshua Randall – (redshirt) sophomore (6'2, 205); 47 – Devaki Williams – freshman (6'1, 245); 48 – Kaleb Proctor – sophomore (6'3, 280); 51 – Matthew Joseph III – (redshirt) freshman (5'11, 265); 57 – Beau Davis – (redshirt) sophomore (6'1, 270); 58 – Rodney Sopsher – (redshirt) junior (6'1, 275); 70 – Nicholas Smith – sophomore (6'3, 315); 90 – Peyton Anderson – freshman (6'3, 260); 91 – Tanner Olsen – (redshirt) senior (6'4, 240); 92 – Carson Dillashaw – freshman (6'6, 255); 93 – Rowan Briggs – sophomore (6'3, 255); 94 – Javen Sanchez – junior (6'1, 290); 95 – Dorian Davis – freshman (6'5, 310); 96 – Dalton Allen – (redshirt) freshman (6'4, 260); 97 – Tyrik Mitchell – (redshirt) junior (5'11, 290); 98 – Austin Kent – (redshirt) junior (5'10, 270); 99 – Charles Hill – (redshirt) junior (6'4, 245); 99 – Tyrin Wise – freshman (6'2, 245); Linebackers: 0 – Herman Christophe IV – senior (5'11, 225); 2 – Donte' Daniels – junior (5'11, 195); 20 – Dominic Lamm – (redshirt) junior (6'1, 200); 26 – Lemar Harris – freshman (6'3, 205); 30 – Anthony Britton Jr. – senior (6'2, 220); 32 – KK Reno – sophomore (6'0, 220); 38 – Slade Ziegler – (redshirt) junior (6'0, 215); 40 – Jordan Okoye – freshman (6'1, 215); 43 – Jirrea Johnson Jr. – freshman (5'11, 220); 49 – Mason Dailey – sophomore (5'11, 210); 50 – Brant Monistere – freshman (5'11, 210); 53 – Ethan Koonce – freshman (6'0, 195)	Defensive backs: 1 – Markell Linzer – (redshirt) sophomore (5'11, 180); 4 – Ian Goodly – sophomore (6'0, 175); 6 – Tyrone Legette – senior (5'10, 170); 10 – Tyler Mansfield – sophomore (5'11, 168); 11 – Kunta Hester – junior (6'0, 185); 12 – Mike Mitchell – freshman (5'11, 180); 12 – Coryell Pierce – junior (5'11, 175); 13 – Rodney Brown Jr. – freshman (6'1, 165); 14 – Ralph Walker – (redshirt) freshman (5'11, 175); 15 – Richard McKneely – freshman (6'0, 180); 16 – Shea Lee Jr. – freshman (6'0, 165); 17 – Mike Newton Jr. – freshman (5'11, 200); 19 – Victor Tademy – senior (5'11, 190); 21 – Scrapp Lee-Collins – (redshirt) junior (6'1, 195); 21 – Jonathan Vaughn – (redshirt) freshman (5'10, 190); 22 – Donald Clay – senior (6'0, 185); 23 – Blayne Delahoussaye – (redshirt) sophomore (5'10, 175); 24 – Tylon Cooper – freshman (6'0, 160); 25 – Varon Douglas – (redshirt) freshman (6'4, 185); 27 – Khamron Ford – junior (5'11, 200); 29 – Robert Buquoi – (redshirt) junior (6'2, 205); 31 – Colin Boldt – freshman (6'2, 205); 31 – Zack Vicknair – (redshirt) freshman (6'0, 205); 33 – Justin Dumas – (redshirt) sophomore (6'1, 205); 39 – Donte Glass – freshman (6'1, 185); 39 – Taylor Martin – (redshirt) junior (5'11, 170); Placekickers: 36 – Mateo Rengifo – senior (5'10, 245); Punters: 26 – Austin Dunlap – senior (6'1, 195); 41 – Riley Callaghan – K/P – sophomore (6'3, 190); 47 – Alec Mahler – K/P – (redshirt) freshman (5'10, 205); 67 – Jack Hunter – freshman (6'3, 200); Long snapper: 59 – Korey Karbowsky – (redshirt) sophomore (6'2, 250); 68 – Andre Callais Jr. – freshman (5'9, 175)
Source and player details, 2023 Southeastern Louisiana Lions (9/1/2023):

== Statistics ==
=== Team ===
	Southeastern Louisiana	Opp
Scoring		
Points per game		
Points per Turnovers		
First downs		
Rushing		
Passing		
Penalty		
Rushing yards		
Avg per play		
Avg per game		
Rushing touchdowns		
Passing yards		
Att-Comp-Int		
Avg per pass		
Avg per catch		
Avg per game		
Passing touchdowns		
Total offense		
Plays		
Avg per play		
Avg per game		
Fumbles-Lost		
Penalties-Yards		
Avg per game		

	Southeastern Louisiana	Opp
Punt-Yards		
Avg per play		
Avg per punt net		
Punt Return-Yards		
Avg per punt return		
Kickoffs-Yards		
Avg per play		
Avg per kick net		
Kickoff Return-Yards		
Avg per kickoff return		
Interceptions-Yards		
Avg per play		
Time of possession / game		
3rd down conversions (Pct%)	(0%)	(0%)
4th down conversions (Pct%)	(0%)	(0%)
Touchdowns scored		
Field goals-Attempts		
PAT-Attempts		
2 point conversion-attempts		
Sack by Yards		
Misc Yards		
Safeties		
Onside kicks		
Red zone scores	(0%)	(0%)
Red zone touchdowns	(0%)	(0%)
Attendance		
Date/Avg per date		
Neutral Site		

=== Individual leaders ===
Passing statistics
#	NAME	POS	RAT	CMP-ATT-INT	YDS	AVG/G	CMP%	TD	LONG
		QB	0.0	0-0-0	0 yrds		0.0%	0 TDs	0
	TOTALS		0.0	0-0-0	0 yrds	0.0	0.0%	0 TDs	0

Rushing statistics
#	NAME	POS	ATT	GAIN	AVG	TD	LONG	AVG/G
		RB	0	0 yrds	0.0	0 TDs	0	0.0
	TOTALS		0	0 yrds	0.0	0 TDs	0	0.0

Receiving statistics
#	NAME	POS	CTH	YDS	AVG	TD	LONG	AVG/G
		WR	0	0 yrds	0.0	0 TDs	0	0.0
	TOTALS		67	730 yrds	10.9	10 TDs	38	243.3

==== Defense ====
Defense statistics
#	NAME	POS	SOLO	AST	TOT	TFL-YDS	SACK-YDS	INT-YDS-TD	BU	QBH	RCV-YDS	FF	BLK	SAF
			0	0	0	0-0 yrds	0-0 yrds	-	-	-	-	-	-	-
	TOTAL		0	0	0	0-0 yrds	0-0 yrds	0-0 yrds- 0 TDs	0	0	-	0	0	-

Key: POS: Position, SOLO: Solo Tackles, AST: Assisted Tackles, TOT: Total Tackles, TFL: Tackles-for-loss, SACK: Quarterback Sacks, INT: Interceptions, BU: Passes Broken Up, PD: Passes Defended, QBH: Quarterback Hits, FR: Fumbles Recovered, FF: Forced Fumbles, BLK: Kicks or Punts Blocked, SAF: Safeties, TD : Touchdown

==== Special teams ====
Kicking/off statistics
#	NAME	POS	XPM-XPA (XP%)	FGM-FGA (FG%)	1–19	20–29	30–39	40–49	50+	PTS	LNG	KICKS	YDS	AVG	TB	OB
		PK	0-0 (0.0%)	0-0 (0.0%)	-/-	-/-	-/-	-/-	-/-	0 pts	0	0	0 yrds	0.0	0	-
	TOTALS		0-0 (0.0%)	0-0 (0.0%)	-/-	-/-	-/-	-/-	-/-	0	0	0	0 yrds	0.0	0	-

Punting statistics
#	NAME	POS	PUNTS	YDS	AVG	LONG	TB	FC	I–20	50+	BLK
		P	-	-	-	-	-	-	-	-	-
	Team	--	0	-	-	-	-	-	-	-	0
	TOTALS		0	0 yrds	0.0	0	0	0	0	0	1

Kick return statistics
#	NAME	POS	RTNS	YDS	AVG	TD	LNG
			-	-	-	-	-
	TOTALS		0	0 yrds	0.0	0 TD's	0

Punt return statistics
#	NAME	POS	RTNS	YDS	AVG	TD	LONG
			-	-	-	-	-
	TOTALS		0	0 yrds	0.0	0 TD's	0

== Conference awards and honors ==
=== Weekly awards ===
Weekly honors
Honors	Player	Position	Date Awarded	Ref.
SLC Defensive Player of the Week	Ian Goodly	DB	September 4, 2023	
SLC Special Teams Player of the Week	Austin Dunlap	P	September 18, 2023	
SLC Special Teams Player of the Week	Austin Dunlap	P	September 25, 2023	
SLC Defensive Player of the Week	Victor Tademy	DB	October 23, 2023	
SLC Defensive Player of the Week	Joshua Randall	DL	November 13, 2023	
SLC Special Teams Player of the Week	Austin Dunlap	P	November 20, 2023	

=== Postseason All–Southland Teams ===
The Southland Conference announced the 2023 all-conference football team selections on November 22, 2023. Southeastern Louisiana had a total of nine players selected.

Offense
1st Team

- Bauer Sharp – tight end, R-SO
- John Allen – offensive lineman, SR
- Austin Dunlap – punter, SR

2nd Team

- Harlan Dixon – running back, JR
- Darius Lewis – wide receiver, R-JR

Defense

1st Team

- Arlen Williams – defensive lineman, R-SR
- Ian Conerly-Goodly – defensive back, SO
- Darius Lewis – punt returner, R-JR

2nd Team

- Herman Christophe IV – linebacker, SR
