= 1957 Southwestern Louisiana Bulldogs football team =

American college football season

1957 Southwestern Louisiana Bulldogs football
- Conference: Gulf States Conference
- Record: 4–5–1 (1–3–1 GSC)
- Head coach: John Robert Bell (1st season)
- Home stadium: McNaspy Stadium

1957 Gulf States Conference football standings
	Conf.					Overall
Team	W		L		T	W		L		T
McNeese State +	4	–	1	–	0	8	–	2	–	0
Northwestern State +	4	–	1	–	0	7	–	2	–	0
Louisiana Tech +	4	–	1	–	0	6	–	4	–	0
Southwestern Louisiana	1	–	3	–	1	4	–	5	–	1
Southeastern Louisiana	1	–	3	–	1	2	–	6	–	1
Northeast Louisiana State	0	–	5	–	0	2	–	6	–	0
+ – Conference co-champions

The 1957 Southwestern Louisiana Bulldogs football team was an American football team that represented the Southwestern Louisiana Institute of Liberal and Technical Learning (now known as the University of Louisiana at Lafayette) in the Gulf States Conference during the 1957 college football season. In their first year under head coach John Robert Bell, the team compiled a 4–5–1 record.

== Schedule ==
Date	Opponent	Site	Result	Attendance	Source
September 14	Sam Houston State*	McNaspy Stadium; Lafayette, LA	W 14–7	6,500	
September 21	at Southeastern Louisiana	Strawberry Stadium; Hammond, LA (Cypress Mug)	T 7–7		
September 28	at Lamar Tech*	Greenie Stadium; Beaumont, TX (rivalry)	L 20–36		
October 5	at Northeast Louisiana State	Brown Stadium; Monroe, LA (rivalry)	W 6–0		
October 12	at Louisiana Tech	Tech Stadium; Ruston, LA (rivalry)	L 13–28		
October 19	Southern State (AR)*	McNaspy Stadium; Lafayette, LA	W 25–6	7,500	
October 26	at Trinity (TX)*	Alamo Stadium; San Antonio, TX	L 7–27		
November 2	Louisiana College*	McNaspy Stadium; Lafayette, LA	W 7–0		
November 9	Northwestern State	McNaspy Stadium; Lafayette, LA	L 0–19		
November 23	McNeese State	McNaspy Stadium; Lafayette, LA (rivalry)	L 0–13	2,500	
*Non-conference game
