= 1957 Southwest Texas State Bobcats football team =

American college football season

1957 Southwest Texas State Bobcats football
- Conference: Lone Star Conference
- Record: 4–6 (3–4 LSC)
- Head coach: R. W. Parker (4th season)
- Home stadium: Evans Field

1957 Lone Star Conference football standings
	Conf.					Overall
Team	W		L		T	W		L		T
Lamar Tech $	5	–	0	–	2	8	–	0	–	2
East Texas State	6	–	1	–	0	9	–	1	–	0
Stephen F. Austin	5	–	2	–	0	6	–	4	–	0
Sam Houston State	3	–	3	–	1	3	–	5	–	1
Southwest Texas State	3	–	4	–	0	4	–	6	–	0
Texas A&I	2	–	4	–	1	5	–	5	–	1
Howard Payne	2	–	5	–	0	3	–	6	–	0
Sul Ross	0	–	7	–	0	3	–	7	–	0
$ – Conference champion

The 1957 Southwest Texas State Bobcats football team was an American football team that represented Southwest Texas State Teachers College (now known as Texas State University) during the 1957 college football season as a member of the Lone Star Conference (LSC). In their fourth year under head coach R. W. Parker, the team compiled an overall record of 4–6 with a mark of 3–4 in conference play.

== Schedule ==
Date	Opponent	Site	Result	Source
September 14	at McNeese State*	Wildcat Stadium; Lake Charles, LA	L 7–27	
September 21	at Texas Lutheran*	Seguin, TX	W 28–12	
September 28	Howard Payne	Evans Field; San Marcos, TX	W 14–13	
October 5	Texas A&I	Evans Field; San Marcos, TX	L 0–16	
October 12	at Sul Ross	Jackson Field; Alpine, TX	W 35–0	
October 19	at Stephen F. Austin	Memorial Stadium; Nacogdoches, TX	L 13–20	
October 26	Abilene Christian*	Evans Field; San Marcos, TX	L 0–47	
November 2	at Lamar Tech	Greenie Stadium; Beaumont, TX	L 20–33	
November 9	Sam Houston State	Evans Field; San Marcos, TX (rivalry)	W 9–0	
November 16	East Texas State	Evans Field; San Marcos, TX	L 13–32	
*Non-conference game
