= 1957 Sam Houston State Bearkats football team =

American college football season

1957 Sam Houston State Bearkats football
- Conference: Lone Star Conference
- Record: 3–5–1 (3–3–1 LSC)
- Head coach: Paul Pierce (6th season)
- Home stadium: Pritchett Field

1957 Lone Star Conference football standings
	Conf.					Overall
Team	W		L		T	W		L		T
Lamar Tech $	5	–	0	–	2	8	–	0	–	2
East Texas State	6	–	1	–	0	9	–	1	–	0
Stephen F. Austin	5	–	2	–	0	6	–	4	–	0
Sam Houston State	3	–	3	–	1	3	–	5	–	1
Southwest Texas State	3	–	4	–	0	4	–	6	–	0
Texas A&I	2	–	4	–	1	5	–	5	–	1
Howard Payne	2	–	5	–	0	3	–	6	–	0
Sul Ross	0	–	7	–	0	3	–	7	–	0
$ – Conference champion

The 1957 Sam Houston State Bearkats football team represented Sam Houston State Teachers College (now known as Sam Houston State University) as a member of the Lone Star Conference (LSC) during the 1957 college football season. Led by sixth-year head coach Paul Pierce, the Bearkats compiled an overall record of 3–5–1 with a mark of 3–3–1 in conference play, and finished fourth in the LSC.

== Schedule ==
Date	Opponent	Site	Result	Attendance	Source
September 14	at Southwestern Louisiana*	McNaspy Stadium; Lafayette, LA	L 7–14	6,500	
September 21	McNeese State*	Pritchett Field; Huntsville, TX	L 7–21	5,000	
October 5	Sul Ross	Pritchett Field; Huntsville, TX	W 32–7	4,500	
October 12	at Texas A&I	Javelina Stadium; Kingsville, TX	W 21–20		
October 19	Lamar Tech	Pritchett Field; Huntsville, TX	T 7–7		
October 26	East Texas State^{†}	Pritchett Field; Huntsville, TX	L 13–21	6,000	
November 2	Howard Payne	Pritchett Field; Huntsville, TX	W 21–20		
November 9	at Southwest Texas State	Evans Field; San Marcos, TX	L 0–9		
November 16	at Stephen F. Austin	Memorial Stadium; Nacogdoches, TX (rivalry)	L 14–28		
*Non-conference game; ^{†}Homecoming
