= 1957 McNeese State Cowboys football team =

American college football season

1957 McNeese State Cowboys football

GSC co-champion
- Conference: Gulf States Conference
- Record: 8–2 (4–1 GSC)
- Head coach: Les DeVall (1st season)
- Home stadium: Wildcat Stadium

1957 Gulf States Conference football standings
	Conf.					Overall
Team	W		L		T	W		L		T
McNeese State +	4	–	1	–	0	8	–	2	–	0
Northwestern State +	4	–	1	–	0	7	–	2	–	0
Louisiana Tech +	4	–	1	–	0	6	–	4	–	0
Southwestern Louisiana	1	–	3	–	1	4	–	5	–	1
Southeastern Louisiana	1	–	3	–	1	2	–	6	–	1
Northeast Louisiana State	0	–	5	–	0	2	–	6	–	0
+ – Conference co-champions

The 1957 McNeese State Cowboys football team was an American football team that represented McNeese State College (now known as McNeese State University) as a member of the Gulf States Conference (GSC) during the 1957 college football season. In their first year under head coach Les DeVall, the team compiled an overall record of 8–2 with a mark of 4–1 in conference play, and finished as GSC co-champion.

== Schedule ==
Date	Opponent	Site	Result	Attendance	Source
September 14	Southwest Texas State*	Wildcat Stadium; Lake Charles, LA	W 27–7		
September 21	at Sam Houston State*	Pritchett Field; Huntsville, TX	W 21–7	5,000	
September 28	at Northwestern State	Demon Stadium; Natchitoches, LA (rivalry)	L 20–23	6,000	
October 5	Louisiana Tech	Wildcat Stadium; Lake Charles, LA	W 13–6		
October 12	at Louisiana College*	Alumni Field; Pineville, LA	W 27–0		
October 19	at Northeast Louisiana State	Brown Stadium; Monroe, LA	W 26–6		
October 26	McMurry*	Wildcat Stadium; Lake Charles, LA	L 6–7	3,000	
November 2	Southern State (AR)*	Wildcat Stadium; Lake Charles, LA	W 27–0		
November 16	Southeastern Louisiana^{†}	Wildcat Stadium; Lake Charles, LA	W 26–0	4,500	
November 23	at Southwestern Louisiana	McNaspy Stadium; Lafayette, LA (rivalry)	W 13–0	2,500	
*Non-conference game; ^{†}Homecoming
