= 1957 Northeast Louisiana State Indians football team =

American college football season

1957 Northeast Louisiana State Indians football
- Conference: Gulf States Conference
- Record: 2–6 (0–5 GSC)
- Head coach: Devone Payne (4th season)
- Home stadium: Brown Stadium

1957 Gulf States Conference football standings
| | Conf. | | | | | Overall |
| Team | W | | L | | T | W | | L | | T |
|---|---|---|---|---|---|---|---|---|---|---|
| McNeese State + | 4 | – | 1 | – | 0 | 8 | – | 2 | – | 0 |
| Northwestern State + | 4 | – | 1 | – | 0 | 7 | – | 2 | – | 0 |
| Louisiana Tech + | 4 | – | 1 | – | 0 | 6 | – | 4 | – | 0 |
| Southwestern Louisiana | 1 | – | 3 | – | 1 | 4 | – | 5 | – | 1 |
| Southeastern Louisiana | 1 | – | 3 | – | 1 | 2 | – | 6 | – | 1 |
| Northeast Louisiana State | 0 | – | 5 | – | 0 | 2 | – | 6 | – | 0 |
+ – Conference co-champions

The 1957 Northeast Louisiana State Indians football team was an American football team that represented Northeast Louisiana State College (now known as the University of Louisiana at Monroe) in the Gulf States Conference during the 1957 college football season. In their fourth year under head coach Devone Payne, the team compiled a 2–6 record.

== Schedule ==
| Date | Opponent | Site | Result | Source |
|---|---|---|---|---|
| September 21 | at Stephen F. Austin* | Memorial Stadium; Nacogdoches, TX | L 7–10 | |
| September 28 | Delta State* | Brown Stadium; Monroe, LA | W 33–0 | |
| October 5 | Southwestern Louisiana | Brown Stadium; Monroe, LA (rivalry) | L 0–6 | |
| October 19 | McNeese State | Brown Stadium; Monroe, LA | L 6–26 | |
| October 26 | Southeastern Louisiana | Brown Stadium; Monroe, LA | L 13–26 | |
| November 2 | at Northwestern State | Demon Stadium; Natchitoches, LA (rivalry) | L 20–26 | |
| November 16 | Louisiana College* | Brown Stadium; Monroe, LA | W 20–19 | |
| November 23 | at Louisiana Tech | Tech Stadium; Ruston, LA (rivalry) | L 6–15 | |
*Non-conference game
