= 1957 Lamar Tech Cardinals football team =

American college football season

1957 Lamar Tech Cardinals football

LSC champion
- Conference: Lone Star Conference
- Record: 8–0–2 (5–0–2 LSC)
- Head coach: James B. Higgins (5th season)
- Home stadium: Greenie Stadium

1957 Lone Star Conference football standings
	Conf.					Overall
Team	W		L		T	W		L		T
Lamar Tech $	5	–	0	–	2	8	–	0	–	2
East Texas State	6	–	1	–	0	9	–	1	–	0
Stephen F. Austin	5	–	2	–	0	6	–	4	–	0
Sam Houston State	3	–	3	–	1	3	–	5	–	1
Southwest Texas State	3	–	4	–	0	4	–	6	–	0
Texas A&I	2	–	4	–	1	5	–	5	–	1
Howard Payne	2	–	5	–	0	3	–	6	–	0
Sul Ross	0	–	7	–	0	3	–	7	–	0
$ – Conference champion

The 1957 Lamar Tech Cardinals football team was an American football team that represented Lamar State College of Technology—now known Lamar University–as a member of the Lone Star Conference (LSC) during the 1957 college football season. Led by fifth-year head coach James B. Higgins, the Cardinals compiled an overall record of 8–0–2 with a mark of 5–0–2 in conference play, winning the LSC title.

== Schedule ==
Date	Opponent	Site	Result	Source
September 14	at Louisiana College*	Alumni Field; Pineville, LA	W 35–20	
September 21	at Northwestern State*	Demon Stadium; Natchitoches, LA	W 20–10	
September 28	Southwestern Louisiana*	Greenie Stadium; Beaumont, TX (rivalry)	W 36–20	
October 5	Stephen F. Austin	Greenie Stadium; Beaumont, TX	W 27–12	
October 12	at East Texas State	Memorial Stadium; Commerce, TX	W 7–6	
October 19	at Sam Houston State	Pritchett Field; Huntsville, TX	T 7–7	
October 26	Howard Payne	Greenie Stadium; Beaumont, TX	W 18–13	
November 2	Southwest Texas State	Greenie Stadium; Beaumont, TX	W 33–20	
November 9	at Texas A&I	Javelina Stadium; Kingsville, TX	T 13–13	
November 16	Sul Ross	Greenie Stadium; Beaumont, TX	W 67–19	
*Non-conference game
