= Battle of the Border (Lamar–McNeese) =

American college sports rivalry

The Battle of the Border is the name of the athletics rivalry between the Cardinals and Lady Cardinals of Lamar University and Cowboys and Cowgirls of McNeese State University (athletically branded as "McNeese" since the 2015–16 school year). Originally in football, the rivalry now covers all sports. In 2009, the rivalry was expanded to include "...head-to-head and SLC [Southland Conference] Championship competition in 14 different sports...". The competition is a joint agreement with the two universities and sponsor, Verizon Wireless

== Background ==
Both universities are public universities in their respective states. Lamar University, located in Beaumont, Texas, is part of the Texas State University System, and McNeese State University, located in Lake Charles, Louisiana, is part of the University of Louisiana System. Lamar and McNeese are about 60 miles apart, accessible via Interstate 10.

== Football ==
Battle of the Border
- Lamar Cardinals McNeese Cowboys
- Sport: Football
- First meeting: November 10, 1951; McNeese State, 13–7
- Latest meeting: November 21, 2026; Lamar, 19–17
- Next meeting: November 20, 2027
- Trophy: None

Statistics
- Total meetings: 44
- All-time series: McNeese leads, 29–14–1
- Largest victory: McNeese State, 38–0 (1971)
- Longest win streak: McNeese State, 6 (1983–1988)
- Current win streak: Lamar, 1 (2026–present)

Locations along Interstate 10.

After the 1989 season, Lamar shut down its football program, before resurrecting it for the 2010 season. The Lamar–McNeese rivalry resumed in 2010.

=== Game results ===
| Lamar victories | McNeese victories | Tie games |

| No. | Date | Location | Winner | Score |
|---|---|---|---|---|
| 1 | November 10, 1951 | Lake Charles, LA | McNeese State | 13–7 |
| 2 | November 8, 1952 | Beaumont, TX | McNeese State | 42–7 |
| 3 | October 29, 1955 | Lake Charles, LA | McNeese State | 17–2 |
| 4 | October 27, 1956 | Beaumont, TX | Lamar | 18–14 |
| 5 | October 22, 1966 | Beaumont, TX | Lamar | 10–7 |
| 6 | October 21, 1967 | Lake Charles, LA | Lamar | 24–8 |
| 7 | September 21, 1968 | Beaumont, TX | McNeese State | 10–0 |
| 8 | September 20, 1969 | Lake Charles, LA | Lamar | 13–7 |
| 9 | October 10, 1970 | Beaumont, TX | McNeese State | 17–12 |
| 10 | October 9, 1971 | Lake Charles, LA | McNeese State | 38–0 |
| 11 | October 7, 1972 | Beaumont, TX | McNeese State | 17–7 |
| 12 | September 22, 1973 | Lake Charles, LA | McNeese State | 20–7 |
| 13 | November 16, 1974 | Beaumont, TX | Lamar | 17–3 |
| 14 | November 29, 1975 | Lake Charles, LA | McNeese State | 20–10 |
| 15 | November 13, 1976 | Beaumont, TX | McNeese State | 27–0 |
| 16 | November 12, 1977 | Lake Charles, LA | Lamar | 35–7 |
| 17 | November 11, 1978 | Beaumont, TX | McNeese State | 24–23 |
| 18 | October 13, 1979 | Beaumont, TX | McNeese State | 34–25 |
| 19 | November 15, 1980 | Lake Charles, LA | McNeese State | 35–3 |
| 20 | October 31, 1981 | Beaumont, TX | Tie | 20–20 |
| 21 | November 13, 1982 | Lake Charles, LA | Lamar | 12–3 |
| 22 | November 19, 1983 | Beaumont, TX | McNeese State | 17–7 |
| 23 | November 17, 1984 | Lake Charles, LA | McNeese State | 34–14 |

| No. | Date | Location | Winner | Score |
|---|---|---|---|---|
| 24 | November 23, 1985 | Beaumont, TX | McNeese State | 28–7 |
| 25 | November 22, 1986 | Lake Charles, LA | McNeese State | 38–7 |
| 26 | November 21, 1987 | Beaumont, TX | McNeese State | 44–36 |
| 27 | November 19, 1988 | Lake Charles, LA | McNeese State | 18–17 |
| 28 | November 18, 1989 | Beaumont, TX | Lamar | 22–17 |
| 29 | September 4, 2010 | Lake Charles, LA | McNeese State | 30–27 |
| 30 | November 19, 2011 | Beaumont, TX | McNeese State | 45–17 |
| 31 | November 17, 2012 | Lake Charles, LA | McNeese State | 35–0 |
| 32 | November 23, 2013 | Beaumont, TX | McNeese State | 42–38 |
| 33 | November 22, 2014 | Lake Charles, LA | Lamar | 27–24 |
| 34 | November 21, 2015 | Beaumont, TX | McNeese State | 20–14 |
| 35 | November 19, 2016 | Lake Charles, LA | McNeese State | 41–10 |
| 36 | November 18, 2017 | Beaumont, TX | McNeese State | 13–3 |
| 37 | November 17, 2018 | Lake Charles, LA | Lamar | 21–17 |
| 38 | November 23, 2019 | Beaumont, TX | McNeese State | 27–3 |
| 39 | March 13, 2021 | Lake Charles, LA | Lamar | 27–26^{OT} |
| 40 | November 19, 2022 | Lake Charles, LA | McNeese | 24–20 |
| 41 | November 18, 2023 | Beaumont, TX | Lamar | 52–27 |
| 42 | November 23, 2024 | Lake Charles, LA | Lamar | 26–24 |
| 43 | November 22, 2025 | Beaumont, TX | McNeese | 21–19 |
| 44 | November 21, 2026 | Lake Charles. LA | Lamar | 19–17 |
Series: McNeese leads 29–14–1

== Men's basketball ==
As of the end of the 2022–23 season, Lamar has a 62–52 lead in men's basketball games against McNeese.

== Women's basketball ==
As of the end of the 2022–23 season, Lamar has a 52–48 series lead in women's basketball over McNeese.

== Baseball ==
As of the end of the 2023 season, Lamar has a 122–84–2 lead over McNeese.

== Soccer ==
As of the end of the 2023 season, Lamar has a 9–6–1 lead over McNeese. Each school sports 3 match winning streaks. McNeese won the first 3 matches.

== Softball ==
As of the end of the 2023 season, McNeese has a 37–7 lead over Lamar

== See also ==
- List of NCAA college football rivalry games
