= Peter Rossomando =

American football player and coach (born 1972)

Current position
- Title: Head coach
- Team: Lamar
- Conference: Southland
- Record: 31–17

Biographical details
- Born: April 7, 1972 (age 54); Staten Island, New York, U.S.

Playing career
- 1990–1993: Boston University
- Position: Offensive/defensive lineman

Coaching career (HC unless noted)
- 1994–1996: New Haven (OL)
- 1997–1998: New Haven (DL/ST)
- 1999: Northeastern (OL)
- 2000: Cortland (OC/OL)
- 2001–2004: Albany (OL)
- 2005–2007: Albany (AHC/OC)
- 2008–2013: New Haven
- 2014–2018: Central Connecticut
- 2019: Rutgers (OL)
- 2020: Vanderbilt (OL)
- 2021–2022: Charlotte (OL)
- 2022: Charlotte (interim HC)
- 2023–present: Lamar

Head coaching record
- Overall: 98–66
- Tournaments: 1–2 (NCAA D-II playoffs); 0–2 (NCAA D-I playoffs)

Accomplishments and honors

Championships
- 3 NE-10 (2010–2012); 1 NEC (2017); 1 Southland (2026)

Awards
- Liberty Mutual Coach of the Year (2012)

Peter Rossomando (born April 7, 1972) is an American college football coach and former player who is currently the head football coach for Lamar University. He served as the interim head coach at University of North Carolina at Charlotte for the final four games of the 2022 football season. He had been the 49ers' offensive line coach for the 2021 and 2022 seasons. He was previously the offensive line coach for Vanderbilt University during the 2020 football season. Rossomando served as the head football coach at the University of New Haven from 2008 to 2013 and Central Connecticut State University from 2014 to 2018. In 2012, he was awarded the Liberty Mutual Coach of the Year Award for NCAA Division II as head coach of the New Haven Chargers.

== Early life ==
Rossomando grew up in Staten Island, New York, one of the five boroughs of New York City. He attended and played football for Port Richmond High School. He was primarily a defensive lineman, though he also played center, long-snapper, and kicked field goals. In 1989, his senior year, the New York Daily News named him to their "All-City football team."

== College career ==
Rossomando attended Boston University on an athletic scholarship. Rossomando played on defense his first three years, moving over to offensive line as a senior. He considered a career in physical therapy, but instead went into coaching upon graduating.

== Coaching career ==
=== Early years ===
Rossomando began his coaching career at the University of New Haven under new head coach Tony Sparano, who had been offensive coordinator at Boston during Rossomando's playing career. Both men spent five years at New Haven and developed a close relationship. Sparano resigned in February 1999 to join the staff of the "new" Cleveland Browns; a month later, Rossomando left to become offensive line coach at Northeastern University under long-time head coach Barry Gallup.

Gallup resigned from Northeastern in May 2000 to become an assistant athletic director at Boston College. New head coach Don Brown did not retain Rossomando, who joined the staff at the State University of New York College at Cortland under head coach Dan MacNeill, then just a few years into a twenty-two year tenure. After one season at Cortland, the University at Albany hired Rossomando as its offensive line coach. Rossomando spent the next seven seasons at Albany as part of Bob Ford's staff. In 2005, he was promoted to offensive coordinator and associate head coach.

New Haven, where Rossomando had coached from 1994–1998 with Tony Sparano, had discontinued football after the 2003 season. The school resumed the program at the end of 2007 and hired Rossomando as its new head coach. It was Rossomando's first head coaching job. The nascent team played four scrimmages in 2008 while Rossomando and the New Haven athletic staff rebuilt the program. The team began competing as a member of the Northeast-10 Conference in 2009. In five years at New Haven, Rossomando's teams won the conference three times and posted an overall record of 42–13. He was awarded the Liberty Mutual Coach of the Year Award for NCAA Division II for the 2012 season.

=== Central Connecticut State ===
After the 2013 season, Central Connecticut State University hired Rossomando as their head coach, replacing Jeff McInerney.

During his tenure at CCSU, Rossomando compiled a record of 23–34. The 2017 team won the Northeast Conference and appeared in the FCS playoffs, the first such appearance for CCSU.

=== Return to assistant coaching ===
Rossomando resigned following the 2018 season to become the offensive line coach at Rutgers under Chris Ash. Rossomando succeeded A. J. Blazek, who had resigned to take the same job at North Dakota State. Rutgers fired Ash midway through the 2019 season; Rossomando departed at the end of the season to become the offensive line coach at Vanderbilt.

Rossomando's hiring was part of a larger reshuffling of assistants at Vanderbilt under seventh-year head coach Derek Mason that included new offensive coordinator Todd Fitch and new defensive coordinator Ted Roof. Vanderbilt fired Mason at the tail end of a COVID-19-shortened season in which the team ultimately went 0–9. New head coach Clark Lea did not retain Rossomando, and the University of North Carolina at Charlotte hired Rossomando as its offensive line coach on March 3, 2021.

=== Charlotte ===
Charlotte head coach Will Healy was heading into his third season. Offensive line coach Lee Grimes had departed after the 2020 season to take the same position at Kansas under Les Miles. Rossomando inherited an offensive line with consistency issues that allowed too many sacks of quarterback Chris Reynolds in 2020. Amid injuries, the quality of line play improved during 2021 as Charlotte managed a 5–7 record.

==== Interim head coaching ====
Charlotte fired Healy on October 23, 2022, after a 1–7 start, and Rossomando took over as interim head coach. As the interim head coach, he led the 49ers to two wins and two losses including a 56–23 over bowl eligible Rice.

=== Lamar ===
On December 10, 2023, Lamar announced that they had hired Rossomando as their next head coach following the departure of Blane Morgan. He brought in former Sam Houston offensive coordinator John Perry, and he reunited with his former defensive coordinator with Central Connecticut, Drew Christ who had spent the previous two seasons as a defensive assistant and special teams analyst with Boston College.

== Head coaching record ==
Year	Team	Overall	Conference	Standing	Bowl/playoffs
New Haven Chargers (Northeast-10 Conference) (2009–2013)
2009	New Haven	5–5	4–4	T–5th	
2010	New Haven	8–2	6–2	T–1st	
2011	New Haven	11–2	8–0	1st	L NCAA Division II Quarterfinal
2012	New Haven	10–1	8–0	1st	L NCAA Division II Second Round
2013	New Haven	8–3	7–2	3rd	
New Haven:		42–13	33–8		
Central Connecticut Blue Devils (Northeast Conference) (2014–2018)
2014	Central Connecticut	3–9	1–5	T–6th	
2015	Central Connecticut	4–7	3–3	T–3rd	
2016	Central Connecticut	2–9	1–5	T–5th	
2017	Central Connecticut	8–4	6–0	1st	L NCAA Division I First Round
2018	Central Connecticut	6–5	4–2	3rd	
Central Connecticut:		23–34	15–15		
Charlotte 49ers (Conference USA) (2022)
2022	Charlotte	2–2 (Note: Rossomandno replaced Will Healy with four games remaining.)	2–2	T–9th	
Charlotte:		2–2	2–2		
Lamar Cardinals (Southland Conference) (2023–present)
2023	Lamar	6–5	5–2	3rd	
2024	Lamar	7–5	4–3	T–3rd	
2025	Lamar	8–5	5–3	2nd	L NCAA Division I First Round
2026	Lamar	10–2	8–1	T–1st	NCAA Division I
Lamar:		31–17	22–9		
Total:		98–66			
National championship Conference title Conference division title or championship game berth

== Personal life ==
Rossomando is married to his wife, Jessica, and they have three children, Reese, Gianna and Nicholas. His brother Nick also played football at Port Richmond High School and was a firefighter on Staten Island. He died in the September 11 attacks. Rossomando stood as godfather to Andrew Sparano, son of Tony Sparano.
