= Lamar Cardinals football =

College football program of Lamar University

| 2026 Lamar Cardinals football team |
- First season: 1923; 103 years ago (Note: The team has been disbanded and reinstated several times, with the following stages being where Lamar University has fielded a football program: From 1923 to 1926; From 1932 to 1942; From 1946 to 1989; The team has played continuously since its last launch in the 2010 season; 16 years ago.)
- Athletic director: Jeff O'Malley
- Head coach: Peter Rossomando; 4th season, 21–14 (.600)
- Location: Beaumont, Texas
- Stadium: Provost Umphrey Stadium (capacity: 16,000)
- Field: W. S. Bud Leonard Field
- Conference: Southland
- Colors: Red and white
- All-time record: 229–311–9 (.425)
- Bowl record: 2–1 (.667)

Conference championships
- LSC: 1957 SLC: 1964, 1965, 1966, 1971, 2026
- Rivalries: McNeese State (rivalry); Louisiana (rivalry)
- Fight song: Cardinals Fight!
- Mascot: Cardinal
- Marching band: The Showcase of Southeast Texas
- Website: lamarcardinals.com

The Lamar Cardinals football program represents Lamar University in college football at the NCAA Division I Football Championship Subdivision (formerly Division I-AA) level. The Cardinals are members of the Southland Conference and play their home games in the 16,000 seat Provost Umphrey Stadium. The Cardinals left the Southland Conference in July 2021 to join the Western Athletic Conference, which relaunched its football league at the FCS level during the 2021 season. After one season in the WAC, Lamar and the Southland Conference announced on July 11, 2022 Lamar's accelerated return to the Southland Conference effective immediately.

== History ==
=== The early years ===
From its inception as South Park Junior College in 1923, football was a part of Lamar's history. It was discontinued in 1928 because of a lack of common opponents but was revived again in 1932 by the renamed Lamar College. Coach John Gray led his charges to records of 8–1 that season and 8–1–1 in 1934 before the program was discontinued again in 1942 and did not resume again until the end of World War II. Football was restored in 1946 and the first football scholarships were offered. In the 1946 season Lamar posted an 8–2 ledger. The 1948 club (8–4–0) won two bowl games, and the 1949 outfit won an all time school record 10 games and another bowl trophy as the school bade farewell to the junior college era.

After the school moved up to the NAIA level in the Lone Star Conference, the Cardinals didn’t have a winning season until a superb 8–0–2 season in 1957 ignited a string of 11 consecutive winning campaigns. The 1961 team advanced to the Tangerine Bowl (now the Capital One Bowl) against Middle Tennessee State on December 29, 1961, and won 21–14.

Just as the Cardinals were becoming a perennial contender in the Lone Star loop, school officials moved the athletic program forward into the National Collegiate Athletic Association (NCAA) college division ranks in 1963 via the Southland Conference. The football team enjoyed immediate success with three straight SLC grid titles (1964–66). In 1964 the Cardinals were invited to the Pecan Bowl after a 6–3–1 campaign. The Cardinals lost 19–17 to Northern Iowa. The Cardinals had a second-place finish in 1967. A year later, the school's athletic program embarked on another challenge by upgrading to the NCAA Division I level.

Lamar averaged 12,000 patrons through 1974, drawing a then record 16,226 against arch-rival McNeese State to Cardinal Stadium in 1972. The transition to Division I proved to be a spark for many LU sports but football experienced a downturn after 1974. Fans responded when new coach Larry Kennan delivered a 6–3–2 club in 1979; Games against Louisiana Tech (17,600) and West Texas State (17,250) rank second and third, respectively, behind the standing-room-only 18,500 Baylor drew for the 1980 opener. Lamar set an all-time attendance record by averaging 16,380 that season. The Cardinals’ signature win came on September 5, 1981, in an 18–17 win over the UPI No. 20 ranked Baylor Bears under Head Coach Larry Kennan.

Football competed as an independent from 1987 to 1989 after Lamar left the Southland Conference in 1987 to join the newly formed non-football American South Conference.

=== Disbandment and reintroduction ===
Dismal support finally led to larger-than-expected deficits and provided the bottom line fodder for five new appointees to the then-Lamar University System board of regents to discontinue football at their first official session on December 15, 1989 (5 to 4 vote). Their vision was to divert money that was being spent on football to the basketball program and build Lamar into a basketball powerhouse.

In 2010, as a member of the Texas State University System, the university brought the football team back. In preparation for the return of play the University did extensive work on the facilities including, Provost Umphrey Stadium, a new 54,000 sq ft Athletic complex, and seven high class suites built into the existing Montagne Center, new field turf, and a new 26' X 51' video board. The university hired former NFL player Ray Woodard as the head coach to lead the charge in bringing the Cardinals back to the gridiron. Former Basketball Coach Billy Tubbs was hired as the Athletic Director in 2006 and had a significant role in bringing back the Cardinals football team.

The football program, discontinued at the end of the 1989 season, was restarted with its first season back in 2010. The team competed as an independent that year. The first conference competition following the restart was in 2011.

== Conference affiliations ==
| Seasons | Conference |
|---|---|
| 1923–1926 | Independent |
| 1927–1931 | Football not a sponsored sport |
| 1932–1942 | Independent |
| 1943–1945 | Football not a sponsored sport – World War II |
| 1946–1950 | Southwestern Junior College Conference |
| 1951–1962 | Lone Star Conference |
| 1963–1986 | Southland Conference |
| 1987–1989 | Division I-AA Independent |
| 1990–2009 | Football not a sponsored sport |
| 2010–2020 | Southland Conference |
| 2021 | Western Athletic Conference |
| 2022–present | Southland Conference |

=== Division history ===
| Seasons | Division |
|---|---|
| 1923–1926 | National Junior College Athletic Association |
| 1927–1931 | Football not a sponsored sport |
| 1932–1942 | National Junior College Athletic Association |
| 1943–1945 | Football not a sponsored sport – World War II |
| 1946–1950 | National Junior College Athletic Association |
| 1951–1962 | National Association of Intercollegiate Athletics (NAIA) |
| 1963–1972 | NCAA College Division (Small College) |
| 1973–1977 | NCAA Division I (University) |
| 1978–1981 | NCAA Division I-A |
| 1982–1989 | NCAA Division I-AA |
| 1990–2009 | Football not a sponsored sport |
| 2010–present | NCAA Division I FCS |

Early Years Reference:

== Conference championships ==
| Season | Conference | Coach | Overall Record | Conference Record |
|---|---|---|---|---|
| 1957† | Lone Star Conference | James B. Higgins | 8–0–2 | 5–0–2 |
| 1964 | Southland Conference | Vernon Glass | 6–3–1 | 3–0–1 |
| 1965 | Southland Conference | Vernon Glass | 6–4 | 3–1 |
| 1966† | Southland Conference | Vernon Glass | 6–4 | 3–1 |
| 1971† | Southland Conference | Vernon Glass | 5–6 | 4–1 |
| 2026† | Southland Conference | Peter Rossomando | 10–2 | 8–1 |

† Denotes co-champions

== Postseason ==
=== Bowl games ===
Lamar participated in two NCAA College Division level bowl games, going 1–1.

| Season | Coach | Bowl | Opponent | Result |
|---|---|---|---|---|
| 1950 | Stan Lambert | Silver Bowl "Tazon De Plata" | Mexico City College | W 19–13 |
| 1961 | James B. Higgins | Tangerine Bowl | Middle Tennessee | W 21–14 |
| 1964 | Vernon Glass | Pecan Bowl | State College of Iowa | L 17–19 |

=== NCAA Division I-AA/FCS playoffs ===
The Cardinals have made two appearances in the Division I-AA/FCS playoffs, with an overall record of 0–2.

| Season | Coach | Round | Opponent | Result |
|---|---|---|---|---|
| 2018 | Mike Schultz | First Round | Northern Iowa | L 13–16 |
| 2025 | Peter Rossomando | First Round | Abilene Christian | L 20–38 |

== Attendance ==
=== Highest attendance ===
Below is a list of the Cardinals top 10 best-attended home games (all at Provost Umphrey Stadium).

| Rk. | Date | Opponent | Attendance |
|---|---|---|---|
Highest attendance
| 1 | September 13, 1980 | Baylor | 18,500 |
| 2 | September 22, 1979 | Louisiana Tech | 17,600 |
| 3 | October 9, 2010 | Langston University | 17,306 |
| 4 | October 6, 1979 | West Texas State | 17,250 |
| 5 | September 17, 1977 | Louisiana-Lafayette | 17,222 |
| 6 | October 2, 2010 | Sam Houston State | 17,187 |
| 7 | September 11, 2010 | Webber International | 16,600 |
| 8 | October 16, 2010 | South Alabama | 16,150 |
| 9 | October 9, 1965 | Arkansas State | 16,000 |
| 10 | September 24, 1966 | Southwest Missouri | 15,643 |

As of the 2024 season.

=== Yearly attendance ===
Below is the Cardinals' home attendance since program reinstatement.

| Season | Average | High |
|---|---|---|
Lamar Cardinals
| 2024 | 6,706 | 8,443 |
| 2023 | 5,643 | 6,583 |
| 2022 | 5,069 | 6,627 |
| 2021 | 5,716 | 6,812 |
| 2020 | 3,293 * | 3,833 * |
| 2019 | 7,173 | 9,218 |
| 2018 | 7,077 | 8,028 |
| 2017 | 6,631 | 8,417 |
| 2016 | 7,429 | 8,697 |
| 2015 | 9,364 | 13,136 |
| 2014 | 8,347 | 10,212 |
| 2013 | 8,379 | 10,738 |
| 2012 | 11,119 | 15,367 |
| 2011 | 14,442 | 15,367 |
| 2010 | 16,078 | 17,306 |

- Attendance restricted due to COVID19 restrictions.

As of the 2024 season.

== Rivalries ==
=== McNeese ===
The two teams have met 43 times on the football field, with McNeese holding a 29–13–1 edge in the all-time series. The rivalry has been expanded from football to head-to-head competition in all sports under a joint agreement with the two universities and Verizon Wireless.

McNeese–Lamar: All-Time Record
| Games played | First meeting | Last meeting | Lamar wins | Lamar losses | Ties | Win % |
|---|---|---|---|---|---|---|
| 42 | November 10, 1951 (lost 7–13) | November 22, 2025 (lost 19–21) | 13 | 29 | 1 | .314 |

=== Louisiana ===
The first Sabine Shoe trophy was first awarded in 1937 to the winner of the SLI–Lamar football game. The name of the bronze rivalry trophy was derived from the Sabine River that forms the Texas–Louisiana border. USL defeated Lamar in the 1978 edition of the rivalry game, but the Ragin' Cajuns were not awarded the trophy as it had vanished. The Sabine Shoe trophy now sits in at trophy case in the Ragin' Cajun Athletic Complex.

Louisiana–Lamar: All-Time Record
| Games played | First meeting | Last meeting | Lamar wins | Lamar losses | Ties | Win % |
|---|---|---|---|---|---|---|
| 34 | October 27, 1923 (lost 16–19) | September 1, 2012 (lost 0–40) | 11 | 23 | 0 | .324 |

== Future non-conference opponents ==
Announced non-conference opponents as of July 23, 2026.

| 2026 | 2027 | 2028 | 2029 | 2030 | 2031 |
|---|---|---|---|---|---|
| Abilene Christian | at Abilene Christian | at Weber State | at Texas State | Abilene Christian | at Abilene Christian |
| at Louisiana | at Rice | | | | |
| at Idaho | | | | | |

== See also ==
- List of NCAA Division I FCS football programs
- List of Lamar Cardinals football seasons
