= Northeast Campus, Tift County High School =

Coordinates: 31°29′9″N 83°30′52″W

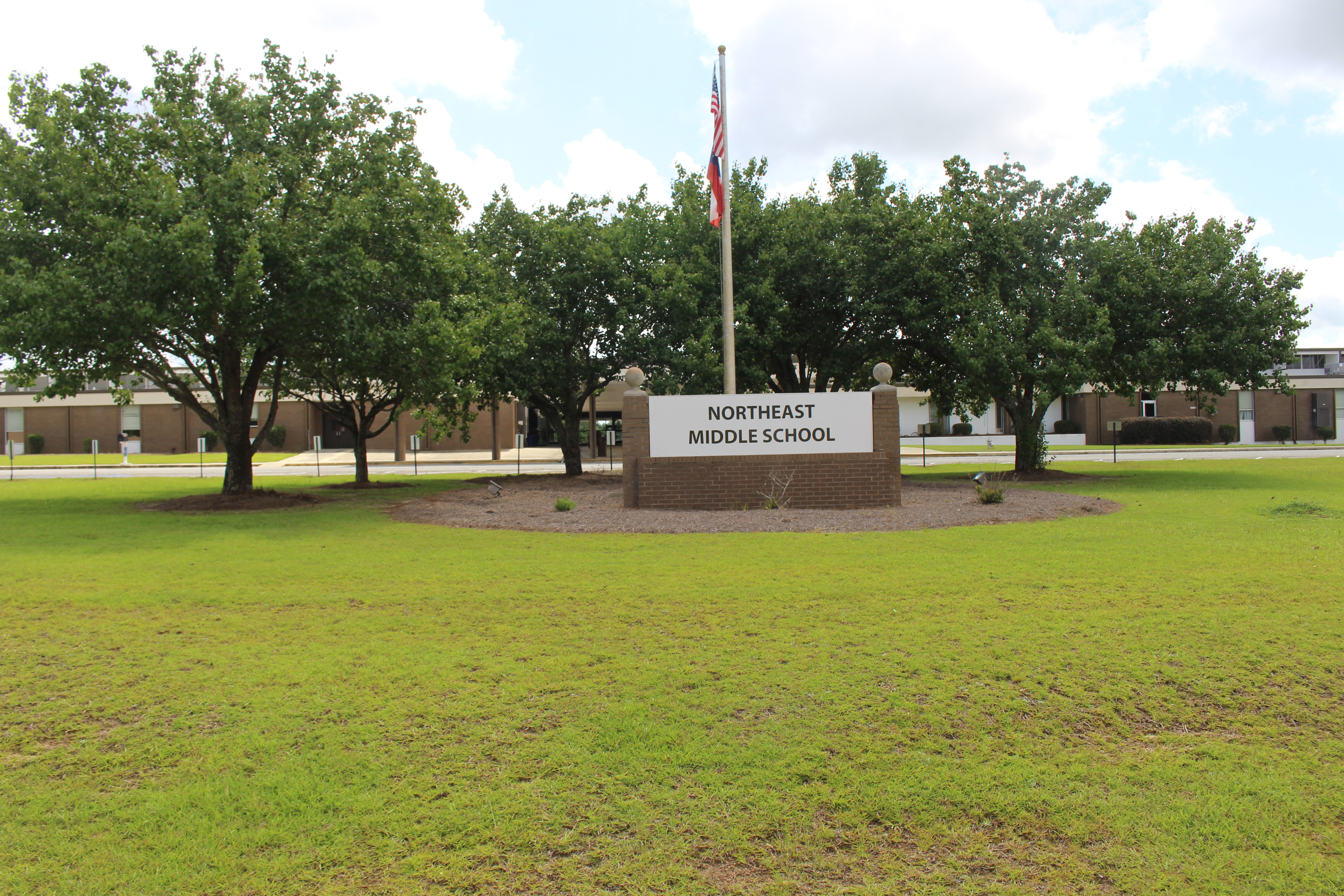

Location
- 3021 Fulwood Road; Tifton, Georgia 31794; United States

Information
- Type: Public high school
- School district: Tift County School District
- Principal: Chris Martin
- Grades: 9
- Enrollment: 600
- Colors: Blue and white
- Athletics: GHSA Class AAAAA-1
- Mascot: Blue Devil
- Team name: TCHS Blue Devils
- Website: northeast.tiftschools.com

Tift County High School, Northeast Campus is a public, rural high school in Tifton, Georgia, United States. It is part of Tift County High School (TCHS).

== History ==
The school was built in 1970. Originally housing 7th, 8th and 9th grades as Tift County Junior High School, the initial enrollment was 1350 compared to approximately 600 today. Tift County High School, Northeast Campus is now a 9th grade school.

== Fine arts ==
- Chorus
- Band

== Clubs ==
- FBLA
- FFA
- Beta Club
- Y-Club
- Yearbook
- Model U.N.
- VICA/SkillsUSA
- HOSA
- Student Council and TSA
- ROTC

== School sports ==
Northeast plays with Tift County High School, as it is part of that school.

Northeast has many sports, including:

- Football
- Boys' basketball
- Girls' basketball
- Boys' soccer
- Girls' soccer
- Baseball
- Softball
- Boys' golf
- Girls' golf
- Football cheerleading
- Basketball cheerleading
- Competition cheerleading
- Cross country
- Boys' track
- Girls' track
- Tennis
- Wrestling
- Swim team
- Gymnastics
