= Tifft =

Tifft is a surname. Notable people with the surname include:

- Matt Tifft (born 1996), American racing driver
- Susan Tifft (1951–2010), American journalist, author, and educator
- William G. Tifft, American astronomer

== See also ==
- Tift (disambiguation)
