= Sixth Street Academy =

Location
- 805 West 6th Street; Tifton, Georgia 31794; United States
- Coordinates: 31.46153°N 83.52065°W

Information
- Type: Public alternative school
- School district: Tift County School District
- Principal: Tonja C. Tift
- Grades: 6–12
- Colors: Blue and white
- Website: sixthstreet.tiftschools.com

Sixth Street Academy is public alternative school located in Tifton, Georgia, United States.
