= Tift =

Tift may refer to:

== Places ==
- Tift County, Georgia, a county in south-central Georgia, United States

== People with the given name ==
- Tift Merritt (born 1975), American singer-songwriter

== People with the surname ==
- Andrew Tift (born 1968), British portraitist
- Asa Tift (fl. 19th century), American salvager
- Nelson Tift (1810-1891), American jurist, businessman, sailor and politician
- Ray Tift (1884-1945), American baseball player

== See also ==
- Tift County School District
- Tift County High School
- Tift College
- Tift County Courthouse
