= 2007 Valdosta State Blazers football team =

American college football season

2007 Valdosta State Blazers football

NCAA Division II champion

NCAA Division II Championship Game, W 25–20 vs. Northwest Missouri State
- Conference: Gulf South Conference

Ranking
- AFCA: No. 1
- Record: 13–1 (7–1 GSC)
- Head coach: David Dean (1st season)
- Offensive scheme: Spread option
- Defensive coordinator: Joe Cauthen (1st season)
- Base defense: 4–3
- Home stadium: Bazemore–Hyder Stadium

2007 Gulf South Conference football standings
	Conf.			Overall
Team	W		L	W		L
No. 10 Delta State $^	8	–	0	10	–	2
No. 1 Valdosta State ^	7	–	1	13	–	1
No. 6 North Alabama ^	7	–	1	10	–	2
Henderson State	6	–	2	7	–	3
Harding	5	–	3	6	–	4
Arkansas Tech	3	–	5	5	–	5
Arkansas–Monticello	3	–	5	4	–	7
Ouachita Baptist	2	–	6	4	–	6
Southern Arkansas	2	–	6	3	–	7
West Georgia	1	–	7	2	–	9
West Alabama	0	–	8	1	–	9
$ – Conference champion; ^ – NCAA Division II playoff participant; Rankings from AFCA poll

The 2007 Valdosta State Blazers football team was an American football team that represented Valdosta State University as a member of the Gulf South Conference (GSC) during the 2007 NCAA Division II football season. In their first year under head coach David Dean, the team compiled a 13–1 record (7–1 against conference opponents) and finished second in the GSC. The team advanced to the NCAA Division II playoffs and defeated Northwest Missouri State, 25–20, in the championship game.

The Blazers played their home games at Bazemore–Hyder Stadium in Valdosta, Georgia.

== Schedule ==
Date	Time	Opponent	Rank	Site	Result	Attendance
September 1	7:00 p.m.	No. 21 Albany State*	No. 6	Bazemore–Hyder Stadium; Valdosta, GA	W 41–3	7,694
September 8	5:00 p.m.	at Fort Valley State*	No. 5	Wildcat Stadium; Fort Valley, GA	W 69–0	5,617
September 22	4:00 p.m.	at Arkansas Tech*	No. 4	Buerkle Field; Russellville, AR	W 28–27	5,851
September 29	4:00 p.m.	Ouachita Baptist	No. 5	Bazemore–Hyder Stadium; Valdosta, GA	W 31–3	5,882
October 6	2:00 p.m.	at Southern Arkansas	No. 5	Wilkins Stadium; Magnolia, AR	W 33–21	4,112
October 11	8:00 p.m.	No. 8 Delta State	No. 5	Bazemore–Hyder Stadium; Valdosta, GA	L 31–35	7,279
October 20	8:00 p.m.	at West Alabama	No. 13	Tiger Stadium; Livingston, AL	W 37–0	4,812
October 27	1:00 p.m.	No. 2 North Alabama	No. 11	Bazemore–Hyder Stadium; Valdosta, GA	W 27–24	4,127
November 3	7:00 p.m.	at Arkansas–Monticello	No. 8	Cotton Boll Stadium; Monticello, AR	W 63–28	1,001
November 8	8:00 p.m.	West Georgia	No. 8	Bazemore–Hyder Stadium; Valdosta, GA (rivalry)	W 35–10	3,842
November 24	1:00 p.m.	No. 12 Catawba	No. 8	Bazemore–Hyder Stadium; Valdosta, GA (NCAA Division II Second Round)	W 55–29	3,228
December 1	1:00 p.m.	No. 10 North Alabama	No. 8	Bazemore–Hyder Stadium; Valdosta, GA (NCAA Division II Quarterfinal)	W 37–23	4,591
December 8	11:00 a.m.	at No. 6 California (PA)	No. 8	Adamson Stadium; California, PA (NCAA Division II Semifinal)	W 28–24	3,100
December 15	12:00 p.m.	vs. No. 5 Northwest Missouri State	No. 8	Braly Municipal Stadium; Florence, AL (NCAA Division II Championship Game)	W 25–20	7,532
*Non-conference game; Rankings from AFCA Poll released prior to the game; All times are in Eastern time

== Rankings ==
Ranking movements Legend: ██ Increase in ranking ██ Decrease in ranking ( ) = First-place votes
	Week													
Poll	Pre	1	2	3	4	5	6	7	8	9	10	11	12	Final
AFCA	6	6	5	4	4	5	5	5	13	11	8	8	8	1 (28)

== Game summaries ==
=== No. 21 Albany State ===
No. 21 Albany State Golden Rams at No. 6 Valdosta State Blazers – Game summary

Quarter	1	2	3	4	Total
No. 21 Golden Rams	0	3	0	0	3
No. 6 Blazers	10	17	7	7	41

at Bazemore–Hyder Stadium, Valdosta, Georgia

- Date: September 1
- Game time: 7:00 p.m. EDT
- Game weather: Cloudy and humid, 85 °F (29 °C)
- Game attendance: 7,694
- Referee: Phillip Kelly
- Box score

Game information
First quarter
- VSU – Zac Williams 23-yard field goal, 12:07. Blazers 3–0. Drive: 10 plays, 54 yards, 2:53.
- VSU – Jeffrey Felton 3-yard pass from Willie Copeland (Zac Williams kick), 5:32. Blazers 10–0. Drive: 10 plays, 80 yards, 3:08.

Second quarter

- ALBN – Tory Torstenson 21-yard field goal, 12:19. Blazers 10–3. Drive: 15 plays, 63 yards, 8:13.
- VSU – Zac Williams 26-yard field goal, 6:23. Blazers 13–3. Drive: 9 plays, 38 yards, 3:01.
- VSU – Ronnye Nelson 6-yard run (Zac Williams kick), 2:35. Blazers 20–3. Drive: 8 plays, 67 yards, 2:53.
- VSU – Scott Palmer 17-yard pass from Willie Copeland (Zac Williams kick), 0:25. Blazers 27–3. Drive: 7 plays, 37 yards, 1:36.

Third quarter

- VSU – Shawn Harris 25-yard blocked punt return (Zac Williams kick), 13:18. Blazers 34–3.

Fourth quarter

- VSU – Thomas Arnold 18-yard run (Zac Williams kick), 10:33. Blazers 41–3. Drive: 10 plays, 78 yards, 3:28.

Statistics	ALBN	VSU
First downs	12	26
Total yards	265	436
Rushing yards	134	208
Passing yards	131	228
Turnovers	2	1
Time of possession	32:20	27:40

Team	Category	Player	Statistics
Albany State	Passing	Kisan Flakes	6/14, 106 yards, 2 INT
Albany State	Rushing	LiRonnie Davis	13 rushes, 54 yards
Albany State	Receiving	Nick Kyles	2 receptions, 68 yards
Valdosta State	Passing	Willie Copeland	18/29, 220 yards, 2 TD
Valdosta State	Rushing	Michael Terry	9 rushes, 74 yards
Valdosta State	Receiving	Cedric Jones	5 receptions, 49 yards

=== At Fort Valley State ===
No. 5 Valdosta State Blazers at Fort Valley State Wildcats – Game summary

Quarter	1	2	3	4	Total
No. 5 Blazers	12	21	22	14	69
Wildcats	0	0	0	0	0

at Wildcat Stadium, Fort Valley, Georgia

- Date: September 8
- Game time: 5:00 p.m. EDT
- Game weather: Hot and muggy, 89 °F (32 °C)
- Game attendance: 5,617
- Referee: Art Williams
- Box score

Game information
First quarter
- VSU – Zac Williams 35-yard field goal, 10:35. Blazers 3–0. Drive: 7 plays, 37 yards, 2:49.
- VSU – Willie Copeland 8-yard run (Zac Williams kick), 8:27. Blazers 10–0. Drive: 5 plays, 42 yards, 1:03.
- VSU – Michael Cullen safety, 1:57. Blazers 12–0.

Second quarter

- VSU – Cedric Jones 54-yard pass from Willie Copeland (Zac Williams kick), 11:08. Blazers 19–0. Drive: 2 plays, 60 yards, 0:41.
- VSU – Cedric Jones 27-yard pass from Willie Copeland (Zac Williams kick), 5:10. Blazers 26–0. Drive: 11 plays, 71 yards, 4:59.
- VSU – Melvin Black 0-yard fumble return (Zac Williams kick), 0:10. Blazers 33–0.

Third quarter

- VSU – Donnie Powell 4-yard pass from Willie Copeland (Zac Williams kick), 11:47. Blazers 40–0. Drive: 7 plays, 78 yards, 3:04.
- VSU – Maurice Leggett 55-yard interception return (kick failed), 5:37. Blazers 46–0.
- VSU – Josh Brown safety, 5:25. Blazers 48–0.
- VSU – Michael Terry 4-yard run (Zac Williams kick), 0:31. Blazers 55–0. Drive: 9 plays, 60 yards, 4:50.

Fourth quarter

- VSU – Tucker Pruitt 5-yard run (Zac Williams kick), 9:15. Blazers 62–0. Drive: 7 plays, 33 yards, 4:39.
- VSU – Ronnye Nelson 10-yard run (Zac Williams kick), 1:38. Blazers 69–0. Drive: 7 plays, 71 yards, 4:14.

Statistics	VSU	FVSU
First downs	24	9
Total yards	460	167
Rushing yards	139	21
Passing yards	321	146
Turnovers	1	4
Time of possession	32:26	27:34

Team	Category	Player	Statistics
Valdosta State	Passing	Willie Copeland	20/30, 249 yards, 3 TD, INT
Valdosta State	Rushing	Michael Terry	6 rushes, 43 yards, TD
Valdosta State	Receiving	Cedric Jones	8 receptions, 132 yards, 2 TD
Fort Valley State	Passing	Zedrick West	12/22, 116 yards, 2 INT
Fort Valley State	Rushing	Garrett Williams	3 rushes, 17 yards
Fort Valley State	Receiving	Melvin Atueyi	6 receptions, 86 yards

=== At Arkansas Tech ===
No. 4 Valdosta State Blazers at Arkansas Tech Wonder Boys – Game summary

Quarter	1	2	3	4	Total
No. 4 Blazers	0	0	14	14	28
Wonder Boys	14	0	13	0	27

at Buerkle Field, Russellville, Arkansas

- Date: September 22
- Game time: 3:00 p.m. EDT/2:00 p.m. CDT
- Game weather: Clear, 86 °F (30 °C)
- Game attendance: 5,851
- Referee: Stan Sence
- Box score

Game information
First quarter
- ATU – Cole Barthal 1-yard run (Travis Cockerham kick), 12:08. Wonder Boys 7–0. Drive: 8 plays, 71 yards, 2:52.
- ATU – Chris Gunter 19-yard pass from Cole Barthel (Travis Cockerham kick), 9:00. Wonder Boys 14–0. Drive: 8 plays, 52 yards, 2:01.

Second quarter

- No scoring plays

Third quarter

- VSU – Willie Copeland 9-yard run (Zac Williams kick), 13:54. Wonder Boys 14–7. Drive: 4 plays, 60 yards, 1:06.
- VSU – Willie Copeland 1-yard run (Zac Williams kick), 7:59. Tied 14–14. Drive: 9 plays, 68 yards, 3:39.
- ATU – R. J. Vanhook 35-yard run (kick blocked), 6:24. Wonder Boys 20–14. Drive: 5 plays, 76 yards, 1:29.
- ATU – Cole Barthel 2-yard run (Travis Cockerham kick), 2:36. Wonder Boys 27–14. Drive: 9 plays, 61 yards, 2:46.

Fourth quarter

- VSU – Michael Terry 16-yard run (Zac Williams kick), 11:11. Wonder Boys 27–21. Drive: 4 plays, 34 yards, 1:01.
- VSU – Ronnye Nelson 4-yard run (Zac Williams kick), 4:44. Blazers 28–27. Drive: 10 plays, 78 yards, 4:41.

Statistics	VSU	ATU
First downs	29	18
Total yards	501	367
Rushing yards	249	132
Passing yards	252	235
Turnovers	2	2
Time of possession	36:40	23:20

Team	Category	Player	Statistics
Valdosta State	Passing	Willie Copeland	30/44, 252 yards, INT
Valdosta State	Rushing	Michael Terry	17 rushes, 137 yards, TD
Valdosta State	Receiving	Cedric Jones	14 receptions, 135 yards
Arkansas Tech	Passing	Cole Barthel	24/41, 235 yards, TD, INT
Arkansas Tech	Rushing	Cole Barthel	11 rushes, 40 yards, 2 TD
Arkansas Tech	Receiving	Tracey Stiger	8 receptions, 89 yards

=== Ouachita Baptist ===
Ouachita Baptist at No. 5 Valdosta State Blazers – Game summary

Quarter	1	2	3	4	Total
Tigers	3	0	0	0	3
No. 5 Blazers	3	7	14	7	31

at Bazemore–Hyder Stadium, Valdosta, Georgia

- Date: September 29
- Game time: 4:00 p.m. EDT
- Game weather: Sunny, 86 °F (30 °C)
- Game attendance: 5,882
- Referee: Phillip Kelly
- Box score

Game information
First quarter
- OBU – Zach Wright 31-yard field goal, 5:59. Tigers 3–0. Drive: 10 plays, 25 yards, 5:19.
- VSU – Zac Williams 31-yard field goal, 2:00. Tied 3–3. Drive: 13 plays, 51 yards, 3:59.

Second quarter

- VSU – Roger King 61-yard punt return (Zac Williams kick), 8:11. Blazers 10–3.

Third quarter

- VSU – Michael Terry 56-yard run (Zac Williams kick), 14:08. Blazers 17–3. Drive: 2 plays, 65 yards, 0:46.
- VSU – Cedric Jones 21-yard pass from Willie Copeland (Zac Williams kick), 3:53. Blazers 24–3. Drive: 6 plays, 73 yards, 2:20.

Fourth quarter

- VSU – Michael Terry 69-yard run (Zac Williams kick), 10:41. Blazers 31–3. Drive: 2 plays, 76 yards, 0:56.

Statistics	OBU	VSU
First downs	16	24
Total yards	258	519
Rushing yards	104	301
Passing yards	154	218
Turnovers	1	2
Time of possession	33:14	26:46

Team	Category	Player	Statistics
Ouachita Baptist	Passing	Lance Parker	18/37, 154 yards, INT
Ouachita Baptist	Rushing	Willie Hopson	24 rushes, 81 yards
Ouachita Baptist	Receiving	Julius Pruitt	8 receptions, 73 yards
Valdosta State	Passing	Willie Copeland	22/37, 218 yards, TD
Valdosta State	Rushing	Michael Terry	9 rushes, 181 yards, 2 TD
Valdosta State	Receiving	Cedric Jones	5 receptions, 57 yards, TD

=== At Southern Arkansas ===
No. 5 Valdosta State Blazers at Southern Arkansas Muleriders – Game summary

Quarter	1	2	3	4	Total
No. 5 Blazers	10	3	14	6	33
Muleriders	7	0	0	14	21

at Wilkins Stadium, Magnolia, Arkansas

- Date: October 6
- Game time: 1:00 p.m. EDT/12:00 p.m. CDT
- Game weather: Partly cloudy and hot, 84 °F (29 °C)
- Game attendance: 4,112
- Referee: Todd Allen

Statistics	VSU	SAU
First downs		
Total yards		
Rushing yards		
Passing yards		
Turnovers		
Time of possession		

Team	Category	Player	Statistics
Valdosta State	Passing		
Valdosta State	Rushing		
Valdosta State	Receiving		
Southern Arkansas	Passing		
Southern Arkansas	Rushing		
Southern Arkansas	Receiving		

=== No. 8 Delta State ===
No. 8 Delta State Statesmen at No. 5 Valdosta State Blazers – Game summary

Quarter	1	2	3	4	Total
No. 8 Statesmen	0	0	28	7	35
No. 5 Blazers	11	6	14	0	31

at Bazemore–Hyder Stadium, Valdosta, Georgia

- Date: October 11
- Game time: 8:00 p.m. EDT
- Game weather: Clear and cool, 67 °F (19 °C)
- Game attendance: 7,279
- Referee: Thomas Graham

Statistics	DSU	VSU
First downs		
Total yards		
Rushing yards		
Passing yards		
Turnovers		
Time of possession		

Team	Category	Player	Statistics
Delta State	Passing		
Delta State	Rushing		
Delta State	Receiving		
Valdosta State	Passing		
Valdosta State	Rushing		
Valdosta State	Receiving		

=== At West Alabama ===
No. 13 Valdosta State Blazers at West Alabama Tigers – Game summary

Quarter	1	2	3	4	Total
No. 13 Blazers	14	10	6	7	37
Tigers	0	0	0	0	0

at Tiger Stadium, Livingston, Alabama

- Date: October 20
- Game time: 7:00 p.m. EDT/6:00 p.m. CDT
- Game attendance: 4,812
- Referee: Stan Sence

Statistics	VSU	UWA
First downs		
Total yards		
Rushing yards		
Passing yards		
Turnovers		
Time of possession		

Team	Category	Player	Statistics
Valdosta State	Passing		
Valdosta State	Rushing		
Valdosta State	Receiving		
West Alabama	Passing		
West Alabama	Rushing		
West Alabama	Receiving		

=== No. 2 North Alabama ===
No. 2 North Alabama Lions at No. 11 Valdosta State Blazers – Game summary

Quarter	1	2	3	4	Total
No. 2 Lions	3	7	14	0	24
No. 11 Blazers	7	6	7	7	27

at Bazemore–Hyder Stadium, Valdosta, Georgia

- Date: October 27
- Game time: 1:00 p.m. EDT
- Game weather: Cloudy and cool, 72 °F (22 °C)
- Game attendance: 4,127
- Referee: Stan Sence

Statistics	UNA	VSU
First downs		
Total yards		
Rushing yards		
Passing yards		
Turnovers		
Time of possession		

Team	Category	Player	Statistics
North Alabama	Passing		
North Alabama	Rushing		
North Alabama	Receiving		
Valdosta State	Passing		
Valdosta State	Rushing		
Valdosta State	Receiving		

=== At Arkansas–Monticello ===
No. 8 Valdosta State Blazers at Arkansas–Monticello Boll Weevils – Game summary

Quarter	1	2	3	4	Total
No. 8 Blazers	21	14	14	14	63
Boll Weevils	14	0	7	7	28

at Cotton Boll Stadium, Monticello, Arkansas

- Date: November 3
- Game time: 6:00 p.m. EDT/5:00 p.m. CDT
- Game weather: Warm and sunny, 71 °F (22 °C)
- Game attendance: 1,001
- Referee: Patrick Smith

Statistics	VSU	UAM
First downs		
Total yards		
Rushing yards		
Passing yards		
Turnovers		
Time of possession		

Team	Category	Player	Statistics
Valdosta State	Passing		
Valdosta State	Rushing		
Valdosta State	Receiving		
Arkansas–Monticello	Passing		
Arkansas–Monticello	Rushing		
Arkansas–Monticello	Receiving		

=== West Georgia ===
West Georgia Wolves at No. 8 Valdosta State Blazers – Game summary

Quarter	1	2	3	4	Total
Wolves	0	10	0	0	10
No. 8 Blazers	7	7	14	7	35

at Bazemore–Hyder Stadium, Valdosta, Georgia

- Date: November 8
- Game time: 8:00 p.m. EST
- Game weather: Clear and cool, 45 °F (7 °C)
- Game attendance: 3,842
- Referee: Stan Sence

Statistics	UWG	VSU
First downs		
Total yards		
Rushing yards		
Passing yards		
Turnovers		
Time of possession		

Team	Category	Player	Statistics
West Georgia	Passing		
West Georgia	Rushing		
West Georgia	Receiving		
Valdosta State	Passing		
Valdosta State	Rushing		
Valdosta State	Receiving		

=== No. 12 Catawba (NCAA Division II Second Round) ===
No. 12 Catawba Indians at No. 8 Valdosta State Blazers (NCAA Division II Second Round) – Game summary

Quarter	1	2	3	4	Total
No. 12 Indians	13	3	0	13	29
No. 8 Blazers	7	6	14	28	55

at Bazemore–Hyder Stadium, Valdosta, Georgia

- Date: November 24
- Game time: 1:00 p.m. EST
- Game weather: Partly cloudy, 60 °F (16 °C)
- Game attendance: 3,228
- Referee: Anthony Purcell

Statistics	CAT	VSU
First downs		
Total yards		
Rushing yards		
Passing yards		
Turnovers		
Time of possession		

Team	Category	Player	Statistics
Catawba	Passing		
Catawba	Rushing		
Catawba	Receiving		
Valdosta State	Passing		
Valdosta State	Rushing		
Valdosta State	Receiving		

=== No. 10 North Alabama (NCAA Division II Quarterfinal) ===
No. 10 North Alabama Lions at No. 8 Valdosta State Blazers (NCAA Division II Quarterfinal) – Game summary

Quarter	1	2	3	4	Total
No. 10 Lions	9	7	7	0	23
No. 8 Blazers	13	3	0	21	37

at Bazemore–Hyder Stadium, Valdosta, Georgia

- Date: December 1
- Game time: 1:00 p.m. EST
- Game weather: Clear and cool, 68 °F (20 °C)
- Game attendance: 4,591
- Referee: T. Levingston

Statistics	UNA	VSU
First downs		
Total yards		
Rushing yards		
Passing yards		
Turnovers		
Time of possession		

Team	Category	Player	Statistics
North Alabama	Passing		
North Alabama	Rushing		
North Alabama	Receiving		
Valdosta State	Passing		
Valdosta State	Rushing		
Valdosta State	Receiving		

=== At No. 6 California (PA) (NCAA Division II Semifinal) ===
No. 8 Valdosta State Blazers at No. 6 California (PA) Vulcnas – Game summary

Quarter	1	2	3	4	Total
No. 8 Blazers	0	7	14	7	28
No. 6 Vulcans	0	14	10	0	24

at Adamson Stadium, California, Pennsylvania

- Date: December 8
- Game time: 11:00 a.m. EST
- Game weather: Overcast, 30 °F (−1 °C)
- Game attendance: 3,100
- Referee: Greg Waybright

Statistics	VSU	CAL
First downs		
Total yards		
Rushing yards		
Passing yards		
Turnovers		
Time of possession		

Team	Category	Player	Statistics
Valdosta State	Passing		
Valdosta State	Rushing		
Valdosta State	Receiving		
California (PA)	Passing		
California (PA)	Rushing		
California (PA)	Receiving		

=== vs. No. 5 Northwest Missouri State (NCAA Division II Championship Game) ===
No. 5 Northwest Missouri State Bearcats vs. No. 8 Valdosta State Blazers (NCAA Division II Championship Game) – Game summary

Quarter	1	2	3	4	Total
No. 5 Bearcats	0	14	0	6	20
No. 8 Blazers	3	0	7	15	25

at Braly Municipal Stadium, Florence, Alabama

- Date: December 15
- Game time: 11:00 a.m. EST/10:00 a.m. CST
- Game weather: Overcast, 60 °F (16 °C)
- Game attendance: 7,532
- Referee: Rodrick Hollowy
- Box score

Game information
First quarter
- VSU – Zac Williams 35-yard field goal, 12:50. Blazers 3–0. Drive: 8 plays, 50 yards, 2:10.

Second quarter

- NWMSU – Aldwin Foster-Rettig 31-yard interception return (Tommy Frevert kick), 13:28. Tigers 7–3.
- NWMSU – Mike Peterson 3-yard pass from Joel Osborn (Tommy Frevert kick), 0:21. Tigers 14–3. Drive: 4 plays, 53 yards, 0:31.

Third quarter

- VSU – Clay Callaway 7-yard pass from Willie Copeland (Zac Williams kick), 11:46. Tigers 14–10. Drive: 6 plays, 44 yards, 1:54.

Fourth quarter

- VSU – Zach Parker 14-yard pass from Ronnye Nelson (Zac Williams kick), 13:21. Blazers 17–14. Drive: 8 plays, 64 yards, 2:08.
- NWMSU – Xavier Omon 2-yard run (kick blocked), 12:33. Tigers 20–17. Drive: 3 plays, 48 yards, 0:48.
- VSU – Roger King PAT return, 12:33. Tigers 20–19.
- VSU – Michael Terry 1-yard run (run failed), 0:22. Blazers 25–20. Drive: 8 plays, 37 yards, 3:39.

Statistics	NWMSU	VSU
First downs	12	19
Total yards	235	305
Rushing yards	87	34
Passing yards	148	271
Turnovers	2	1
Time of possession	30:38	29:22

Team	Category	Player	Statistics
Northwest Missouri State	Passing	Joel Osborn	18/28, 148 yards, TD, 2 INT
Northwest Missouri State	Rushing	Xavier Omon	27 rushes, 63 yards, TD
Northwest Missouri State	Receiving	Mike Peterson	5 receptions, 57 yards, TD
Valdosta State	Passing	Willie Copeland	29/44, 257 yards, TD, INT
Valdosta State	Rushing	Michael Terry	12 rushes, 36 yards, TD
Valdosta State	Receiving	Cedric Jones	10 rushes, 95 yards

== Roster ==
2007 Valdosta State Blazers football team roster
Players
Coaches
Offense

Pos.	#	Name	Class
WR	1	Jeffrey Felton	Sr
QB	3	Doug Pilcher	Fr
QB	4	Russ Callaway	Fr
WR	8	Cedric Jones	So
QB	9	Ronnye Nelson	Fr
QB	12	Tucker Pruitt	Jr
QB	13	Willie Copeland	Sr
WR	14	Josh Rayam	So
QB	15	Clay Callaway	Sr
RB	20	Gabe Mould	So
RB	21	Thomas Arnold	So
RB	22	Rashawn Robinson	Jr
RB	23	P. J. Katz	Fr
RB	25	Donnie Powel	Jr
RB	27	Michael Terry	Sr
WR	28	Travis Taylor	Sr
RB	34	Scott Palmer	Sr
FB	38	Andrew Dunn	So

Defense

Pos.	#	Name	Class
S	2	Maurice Leggett	Sr
LB	5	Marcel Horne	Sr
ROV	6	Eric Willimas	Jr
DB	10	Sherard Reynolds	Jr
CB	19	Shawn Harris	Sr
DB	24	Carlos Anderson	Sr
DB	29	Kevin Bray	Sr
DB	30	Chance Darley	Sr
ROV	31	Everett Kitchens	Jr
DB	32	Larry Dean	Fr
LB	33	Fabian Whylly	Jr
DB	35	Josh Brown	Fr
FS	36	Greg Petty	Sr
LB	39	Jamaal Clark	So

Special teams

Pos.	#	Name	Class
K	16	Chad Gallahan	Jr
K	41	Zachary Williams	Jr
P	86	Steven Wright	Fr

Head coach

- David Dean

Coordinators/assistant coaches

- Joe Cauthen
  Defensive coordinator
- David Elsenrath
  Assistant head coach/Offensive line
- Earl Chambers
  Defensive line
- James Colzie
  Secondary
- Buster Faulkner
  Quarterbacks
- Sean Calhoun
  Running backs
- Tony Haynes
  Wide receivers
- Brian Simmons
  Safeties
- Barrett Wilkes
  Running backs

Legend

- (C) Team captain
- (S) Suspended
- (I) Ineligible
- Injured
- Redshirt
