= Tyre West =

American football player (born 2003)

Profile
- Position: Defensive end

Personal information
- Born: January 18, 2003 (age 23); Tifton, Georgia, U.S.
- Listed height: 6 ft 2 in (1.88 m)
- Listed weight: 278 lb (126 kg)

Career information
- High school: Tift County (Tifton, Georgia)
- College: Tennessee (2022–2025)
- NFL draft: 2026: 7th round, 222nd overall pick

Career history
- Detroit Lions (2026)*
- * Offseason or practice squad member only
- Stats at Pro Football Reference

Tyre Deshaun West (born January 18, 2003) is a professional American football defensive end. He played college football for the Tennessee Volunteers and was selected by the Lions in the seventh round of the 2026 NFL draft.

== Early life ==
West is from Tifton, Georgia, and attended Tift County High School where he played football as defensive lineman. He was a starter there all four years, earning honorable mention all-region as a freshman before being named first-team all-region as a sophomore when he posted 47 tackles and 10 tackles-for-loss (TFLs). As a junior, he was named first-team all-state after posting 31 solo tackles and 12.5 sacks. At Tift County, West was a starter in all four seasons he attended.

West was ranked a four-star prospect and one the top-200 recruits in the class of 2022. He initially committed to play college football for the Georgia Bulldogs. He later decommitted from the Bulldogs and committed to the Tennessee Volunteers.

== College career ==
As a true freshman at Tennessee in 2022, West totaled nine tackles, five TFLs and two sacks. The following year, he totaled 17 tackles, three TFLs and two sacks, including a four-tackle, 1.5-sack performance in a win against Iowa in the 2024 Citrus Bowl. In 2024, he posted 16 tackles, five TFLs, two sacks and a forced fumble. West recorded 22 tackles, seven TFLs, four sacks and a forced fumble as a senior in 2025. He concluded his collegiate career having recorded 64 tackles, 20 TFLs, 10 sacks and two forced fumbles in 47 games. He was invited to the 2026 Senior Bowl.

== Professional career ==
Pre-draft measurables
Height	Weight	Arm length	Hand span	Wingspan	40-yard dash	10-yard split	20-yard split	20-yard shuttle	Vertical jump	Broad jump	Bench press
6 ft 1 7/8 in (1.88 m)	283 lb (128 kg)	33 3/8 in (0.85 m)	10 1/4 in (0.26 m)	6 ft 8 1/4 in (2.04 m)	4.85 s	1.68 s	2.79 s	4.84 s	33.0 in (0.84 m)	9 ft 3 in (2.82 m)	20 reps
All values from Pro Day

West was selected by the Detroit Lions with the 222nd overall pick in the seventh round of the 2026 NFL draft. On August 30, West was waived by the Lions as a part of final roster cuts; he was re-signed to the team's practice squad the following day. On September 11, West was waived by Detroit.
