= Bryan Ellis =

American football coach (born 1988)

Current position
- Title: Quarterbacks coach
- Team: Alabama
- Conference: SEC

Biographical details
- Born: September 13, 1988 (age 37); Macon, Georgia

Playing career
- 2007–2011: UAB
- Position: Quarterback

Coaching career (HC unless noted)
- 2012–2013: UAB (GA)
- 2014: Western Kentucky (OQC)
- 2015: Western Kentucky (RB)
- 2016: Western Kentucky (PGC/WR)
- 2017: USC (OA)
- 2018: USC (QB)
- 2019–2020: Western Kentucky (OC/QB)
- 2021: Western Kentucky (co-OC/IWR)
- 2022–2023: Georgia Southern (OC/QB)
- 2024–2025: Alabama (TE)
- 2026–present: Alabama (QB)

Bryan Ellis (born September 13, 1988) is an American college football coach. He is the quarterbacks coach for the University of Alabama, a position he has held since 2026.

== Playing career ==
Ellis grew up in Byron, Georgia and initially attended Tiftarea Academy. He transferred to Peach County High School before his senior year. Ellis passed for over 3,600 and had 31 touchdown passes in his lone season at the school.

Ellis played college football for the UAB Blazers and redshirted his true freshman season after undergoing shoulder surgery. He had a second surgery that led to him missing his redshirt freshman season. As a redshirt sophomore, Ellis appeared in four games as a field goal holder and one as a quarterback in 2009, where he completed one-of-four passes for 14 yards against Texas A&M. He became the Blazers' starting quarterback four games into his redshirt junior season and finished the year with 2,940 passing yards and 25 touchdown passes with 12 interceptions. Ellis was named UAB's starting quarterback entering his redshirt senior season. He missed most of the season due to injury completed 67-of-127 pass attempts for 743 yards with two touchdowns and five interceptions.

== Coaching career ==
Ellis was hired as graduate assistant at UAB following his senior year to start his coaching career. He was hired as an offensive quality control coach at Western Kentucky University (WKU) in 2014 by Hilltoppers' offensive coordinator Tyson Helton– who had been his quarterbacks coach at UAB when playing. Ellis was promoted to running backs coach after one season and was elevated to wide receivers coach and passing game coordinator the following year. He was hired to serve as an offensive quality control coach at the University of Southern California (USC) in 2018 by head coach Clay Helton, Tyson Helton's brother. Ellis was promoted to quarterbacks coach after one year.

Ellis returned to Western Kentucky as the offensive coordinator and quarterbacks coach at as part of Tyson Helton's inaugural staff as head coach in 2019. He was moved to co-offensive coordinator and inside wide receivers coach after two seasons when Zach Kittley was hired as offensive coordinator and quarterbacks coach. Ellis was hired by Clay Helton as offensive coordinator and quarterbacks coach at Georgia Southern University after he was hired as the Eagles' head coach. On February 19, 2024, Ellis was hired by Kalen DeBoer as the tight ends coach at the University of Alabama after he was hired as the Alabama Crimson Tide's head coach.
