= Larry Dean (gridiron football) =

American football player (born 1988)

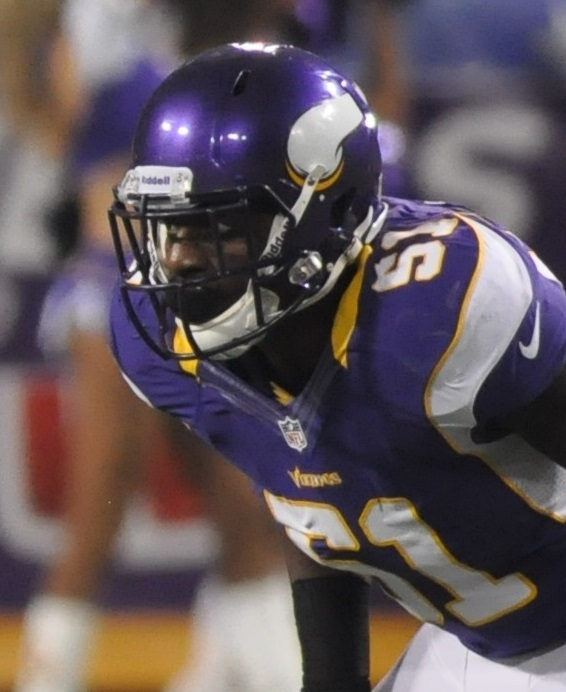
- Dean with the Minnesota Vikings in 2012

No. 51, 54, 11
- Position: Linebacker

Personal information
- Born: August 7, 1988 (age 38); Tifton, Georgia, U.S.
- Listed height: 6 ft 0 in (1.83 m)
- Listed weight: 226 lb (103 kg)

Career information
- High school: Tift County (Tifton)
- College: Valdosta State
- NFL draft: 2011: undrafted

Career history

Playing
- Minnesota Vikings (2011–2013); Buffalo Bills (2014); Tampa Bay Buccaneers (2015)*; Hamilton Tiger-Cats (2016–2018); Edmonton Eskimos (2019); Hamilton Tiger-Cats (2020)*; Saskatchewan Roughriders (2021–2023)
- * Offseason or practice squad member only

Operations
- Saskatchewan Roughriders (2024–present) Player personnel coordinator

Awards and highlights
- 2× CFL East All-Star (2017, 2018); 2× CFL West All-Star (2019, 2023); James P. McCaffrey Trophy - 2018; NCAA Division II national champion (2007)

Career NFL statistics
- Total tackles: 37
- Stats at Pro Football Reference

Career CFL statistics
- Total tackles: 221
- Sacks: 5
- Interceptions: 2
- Stats at CFL.ca

Larry Dean (born August 7, 1988) is an American former professional football player who was a linebacker in the National Football League (NFL) and Canadian Football League (CFL). He was signed by the Minnesota Vikings as an undrafted free agent in 2011. He played college football for the Valdosta State Blazers. Dean was also a member of the Buffalo Bills, Tampa Bay Buccaneers, Hamilton Tiger-Cats, Edmonton Eskimos, and Saskatchewan Roughriders.

== College career ==
In college, Dean helped lead the Blazers to the 2007 NCAA Division II national championship as just a freshman.

== Professional career ==
Pre-draft measurables
Height	Weight	40-yard dash	10-yard split	20-yard shuttle	Three-cone drill	Vertical jump	Broad jump	Bench press
5 ft 11 3/4 in (1.82 m)	229 lb (104 kg)	4.50 s	1.50 s	4.37 s	6.79 s	36.5 in (0.93 m)	10 ft 1 in (3.07 m)	22 reps
All values from Pro Day

=== Minnesota Vikings ===
After waiting out an NFL lockout in 2011, Dean graduated from Valdosta State and signed his free agent rookie contract with the Minnesota Vikings on the same day. He was the only undrafted free agent to make the Vikings' roster in 2011. Dean played three seasons in Minnesota, playing in all 48 regular season games and one playoff appearance. In 2012, Dean was one of only 11 special teams players on the NFC's Pro Bowl ballot. He contributed with 26 tackles, one forced fumble and one fumble recovery.

=== Buffalo Bills ===
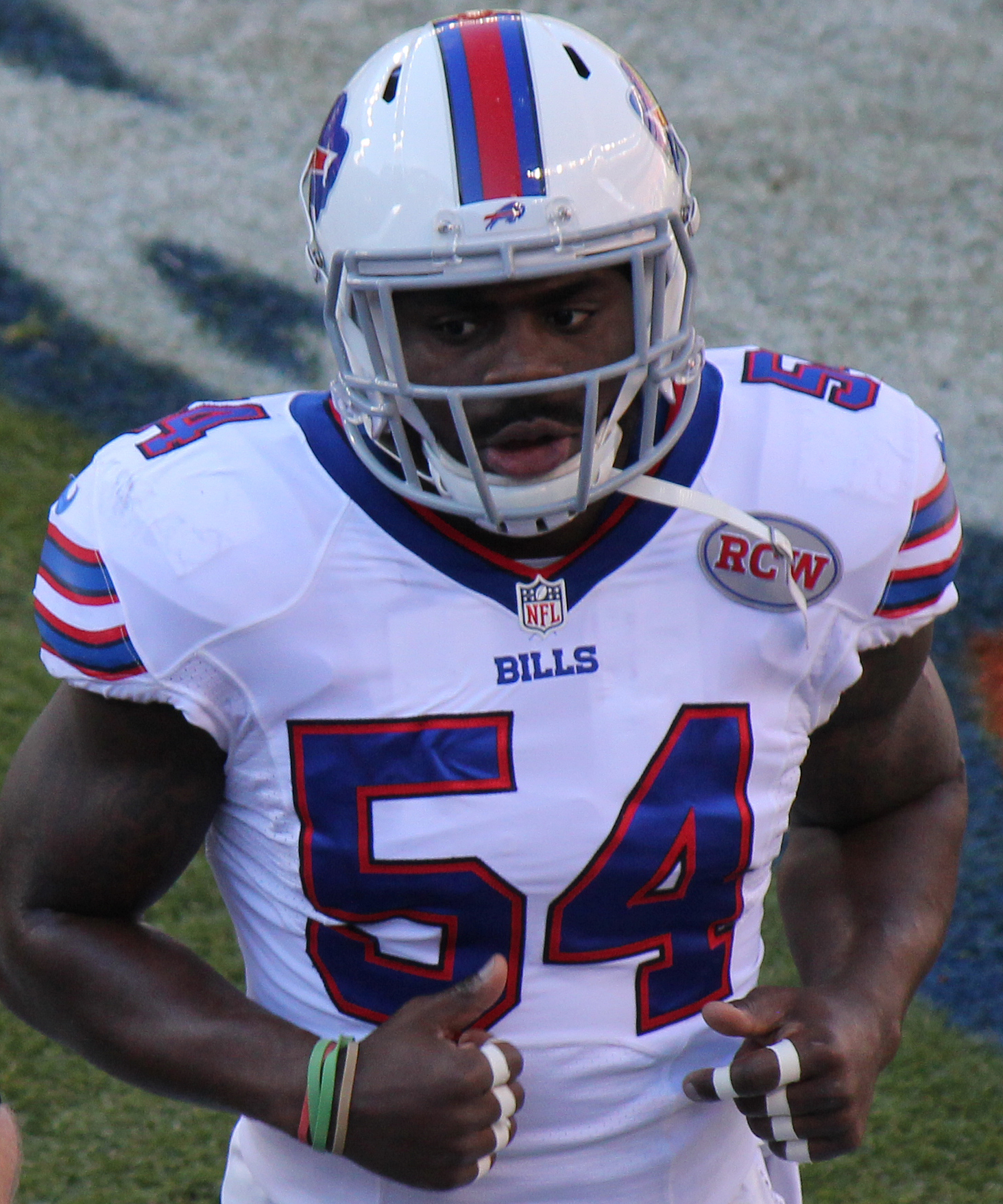
Dean with the Buffalo Bills in 2014

Following his departure from the Minnesota Vikings Dean signed with the Buffalo Bills for the 2014 season. Dean played in 13 games for the Bills in 2014, recording seven tackles.

=== Tampa Bay Buccaneers ===
Dean briefly joined the Tampa Bay Buccaneers but did not make an appearance for the team.

=== Hamilton Tiger-Cats (first stint) ===
After five seasons in the NFL Dean joined the Hamilton Tiger-Cats of the Canadian Football League (CFL). In his first season in the CFL Dean made an immediate impact. He played in all 18 regular season games, amassing 78 defensive tackles, two sacks and an interception. Over the following two seasons Dean was named a CFL East All-Star in each season contributing with 201 tackles, three quarterback sacks and two interceptions.

=== Edmonton Eskimos ===
On the first day of free agency Dean signed with the Edmonton Eskimos. In his lone season in Edmonton Dean once again played in all 18 regular season games recording 86 tackles and one sack. He was the unanimous selection for the team's Most Outstanding Defensive Player.

=== Hamilton Tiger-Cats (second stint) ===
On February 11, 2020, Larry Dean and the Tiger-Cats agreed to reunite for another season. However the 2020 season was cancelled and Dean was not re-signed by the Tiger-Cats.

=== Saskatchewan Roughriders ===
On February 9, 2021, he was signed by the Saskatchewan Roughriders. On July 8, 2021, Dean tore his Achilles' tendon in a workout ahead of training camp. He was placed on the injured list on July 14. Dean missed the entire 2021 season because of the injury. Dean was re-signed by the Riders on February 3, 2022. Dean had an outstanding season in 2022, eclipsing 100 defensive tackles for the second time in his career.. He also contributed with three sacks, two interceptions and two forced fumbles. On February 8, 2023, Dean and the Riders agreed on another contract extension.

On February 13, 2024, he became a free agent. On March 7, 2024, Dean retired and became the Roughriders’ player personnel coordinator in football operations.

== Personal life ==
Local residents petitioned the mayor of Tifton to erect signs in honor of Dean. A sign was later erected that says "Welcome to Tifton, Hometown of NFL Linebacker Larry Dean."
