= 2007 North Alabama Lions football team =

American college football season

2007 North Alabama Lions football

NCAA Division II Quarterfinal, L 23–37 at Valdosta State
- Conference: Gulf South Conference

Ranking
- AFCA: No. 6
- Record: 10–2 (7–1 GSC)
- Head coach: Mark Hudspeth (6th season)
- Offensive coordinator: Kenny Edenfield (6th season)
- Offensive scheme: Multiple
- Defensive coordinator: Karl Morgan (3rd season)
- Base defense: Multiple
- Home stadium: Braly Municipal Stadium

2007 Gulf South Conference football standings
	Conf.			Overall
Team	W		L	W		L
No. 10 Delta State $^	8	–	0	10	–	2
No. 1 Valdosta State ^	7	–	1	13	–	1
No. 6 North Alabama ^	7	–	1	10	–	2
Henderson State	6	–	2	7	–	3
Harding	5	–	3	6	–	4
Arkansas Tech	3	–	5	5	–	5
Arkansas–Monticello	3	–	5	4	–	7
Ouachita Baptist	2	–	6	4	–	6
Southern Arkansas	2	–	6	3	–	7
West Georgia	1	–	7	2	–	9
West Alabama	0	–	8	1	–	9
$ – Conference champion; ^ – NCAA Division II playoff participant; Rankings from AFCA poll

The 2007 North Alabama Lions football team represented the University of North Alabama as a member of the Gulf South Conference (GSC) during the 2007 NCAA Division II football season. Led by sixth-year head coach Mark Hudspeth, the Lions compiled an overall record of 10–2 with a mark of 7–1 in conference play, placing second in the GSC. For the third straight season, North Alabama advanced to the NCAA Division II football championship playoffs, where, after a first round by, the Lions defeated GSC champion Delta State in the second round before losing to fellow GSC runner-up and eventual national champion, Valdosta State, in the semifinals. The team played home games at Braly Municipal Stadium in Florence, Alabama.

== Schedule ==
Date	Time	Opponent	Rank	Site	TV	Result	Attendance
September 8	6:00 p.m.	Tusculum*	No. 4	Braly Stadium; Florence, AL	CSTV Online	W 43–24	9,315
September 13	7:00 p.m.	at Harding*	No. 3	First Security Stadium; Searcy, AR	CSS	W 57–17	3,100
September 22	6:00 p.m.	Southern Arkansas	No. 3	Braly Stadium; Florence, AL		W 27–8	7,725
September 29	6:00 p.m.	at Arkansas Tech	No. 3	Buerkle Field; Russellville, AR		W 27–20	6,081
October 6	6:00 p.m.	Ouachita Baptist	No. 3	Braly Stadium; Florence, AL		W 40–7	7,235
October 13	3:00 p.m.	at Arkansas–Monticello	No. 3	Cotton Boll Stadium; Monticello, AR		W 46–27	3,186
October 18	7:00 p.m.	Delta State*	No. 2	Braly Stadium; Florence, AL	CSS	W 28–17	8,700
October 27	12:00 p.m.	at Valdosta State	No. 2	Bazemore–Hyder Stadium; Valdosta, GA	CSTV Online	L 24–27	4,127
November 3	6:00 p.m.	West Georgia^{†}	No. 10	Braly Stadium; Florence, AL		W 65–17	8,024
November 10	6:00 p.m.	West Alabama	No. 10	Braly Stadium; Florence, AL (rivalry)		W 49–20	10,206
November 24	12:00 p.m.	No. 9 Delta State*	No. 10	Braly Stadium; Florence, AL (NCAA Division II Second Round)		W 20–17	5,575
December 1	12:00 p.m	at No. 8 Valdosta State*	No. 10	Bazemore–Hyder Stadium; Valdosta, GA (NCAA Division II Quarterfinal)		L 23–37	4,591
*Non-conference game; ^{†}Homecoming; Rankings from AFCA Poll released prior to the game; All times are in Central time

== Game summaries ==
=== Tusculum ===
	1	2	3	4	Total
Pioneers	7	10	0	7	24
Lions	14	20	9	0	43

=== Harding ===
	1	2	3	4	Total
Lions	3	28	13	14	58
Bison	3	7	7	0	17

=== Southern Arkansas ===
	1	2	3	4	Total
Muleriders	0	0	0	8	8
Lions	7	7	6	7	27

=== Arkansas Tech ===
	1	2	3	4	Total
Lions	7	3	14	3	27
Wonderboys	7	6	0	7	20

=== Ouachita Baptist ===
	1	2	3	4	Total
Tigers	7	0	0	0	7
Lions	7	19	14	0	40

=== Arkansas–Monticello ===
	1	2	3	4	Total
Lions	14	23	0	9	46
Boll Weevils	7	0	7	13	27

=== Delta State ===
	1	2	3	4	Total
Statesmen	3	7	7	0	17
Lions	14	0	7	7	28

=== Valdosta State ===
	1	2	3	4	Total
Lions	3	7	14	0	24
Blazers	7	5	7	7	26

=== West Georgia ===
	1	2	3	4	Total
Wolves	0	10	7	0	17
Lions	10	13	14	28	65

=== West Alabama ===
	1	2	3	4	Total
Tigers	0	13	7	0	20
Lions	21	14	14	0	49

=== Delta State ===
	1	2	3	4	Total
Statesmen	0	10	0	7	17
Lions	3	7	3	7	20

=== Valdosta State ===
	1	2	3	4	Total
Lions	9	7	7	0	23
Blazers	13	3	0	21	37
