= Clay Shiver =

American football player (born 1972)

No. 50, 60
- Positions: Center, guard

Personal information
- Born: December 7, 1972 (age 53); Tifton, Georgia, U.S.
- Listed height: 6 ft 2 in (1.88 m)
- Listed weight: 283 lb (128 kg)

Career information
- High school: Tift County (Tifton)
- College: Florida State
- NFL draft: 1996: 3rd round, 67th overall pick

Career history
- Dallas Cowboys (1996–1998); Denver Broncos (1999)*; Carolina Panthers (1999)
- * Offseason or practice squad member only

Awards and highlights
- Bowl Coalition National Championship (1993); Jacobs Blocking Trophy (1994, 1995); Consensus All-American (1995); First-team All-American (1994); 3× First-team All-ACC (1993, 1994, 1995)

Career NFL statistics
- Games played: 44
- Games started: 25
- Fumble recoveries: 1
- Stats at Pro Football Reference

Spencer Clay Shiver (born December 7, 1972) is an American former professional football player who was a center in the National Football League (NFL) for the Dallas Cowboys and Carolina Panthers. He played college football for the Florida State Seminoles, winning a national championship in 1993 and earning consensus All-American honors in 1995.

== Early life ==
Shiver was born in Tifton, Georgia. He attended Tift County High School, where he played football for the Blue Devils, while receiving recognition as a Parade All-America and an All-State selection as a senior.

== College career ==
Shiver accepted a football scholarship to attend Florida State University, where he played for coach Bobby Bowden's Florida State Seminoles football team. In 1992, he shared the starting center role (5 starts) as a redshirt freshman, helping the team to an 11-1 record and an Orange Bowl invitation.

As a sophomore in 1993, he was the snapper for quarterback Charlie Ward and a member of the Seminoles' Bowl Coalition national championship team that defeated the Nebraska Cornhuskers 18–16 in the Orange Bowl. He received his first All-conference selection, while giving up a half of a quarterback sack in 700 offensive snaps.

In his junior and senior years, he was awarded the Jacobs Blocking Trophy, presented annually to the best blocker in the ACC. In his last year, he helped the offense averaged 551.5 yards-per-game, ranking third in the nation.

In 2001, he was inducted into the Florida State Athletics Hall of Fame. Bowden called him "the best center that I've coached in 20 years at Florida State."

== Professional career ==
=== Dallas Cowboys ===
Shiver was selected by the Dallas Cowboys in the third round (67th overall) of the 1996 NFL draft. As a rookie, he was the backup to Pro Bowler Ray Donaldson and was used at the tight end position in short yardage situations.

In 1997, he replaced Donaldson at center and was the only lineman to start every game at the same position. He started the first nine games in 1998, before being limited with a turf toe injury and eventually being replaced in the starting lineup with 31-year-old rookie Mike Kiselak.

=== Denver Broncos ===
In 1999, he signed as a free agent with the Denver Broncos, but was waived before the start of the season due to injury.

=== Carolina Panthers ===
On December, 14, 1999, he was signed by the Carolina Panthers to fill the roster spot left open by the injured Nate Newton, but he did not appear in a regular season game. He was released on August 27, 2000.

== Personal life ==
Shiver is currently a high school football head coach for Boca Raton Christian School.
