= Tyson Summers =

American football player and coach (born 1980)

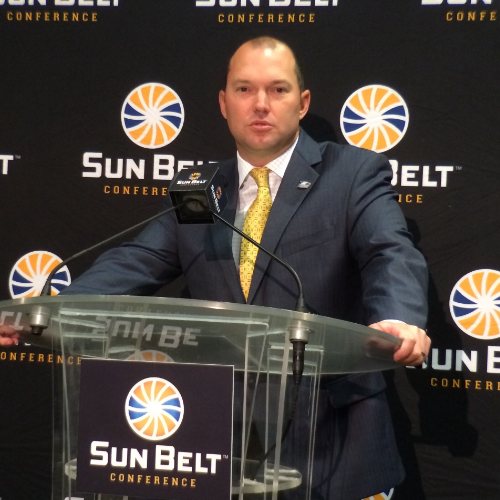
- Summers at 2016 Sun Belt Media Day

Biographical details
- Born: April 11, 1980 (age 46); Tifton, Georgia, U.S.

Playing career
- 1998–2001: Presbyterian
- Position: Linebacker

Coaching career (HC unless noted)
- 2002: Tift County HS (GA) (DB)
- 2003: Presbyterian (DB)
- 2004: Troy (GA)
- 2005: Georgia (GA)
- 2006: Georgia Southern (S)
- 2007–2010: UAB (LB)
- 2011: UAB (S/co-ST)
- 2012–2014: UCF (DC)
- 2015: Colorado State (DC/S)
- 2016–2017: Georgia Southern
- 2018: Georgia (DQC)
- 2019: Colorado (DC/S)
- 2020: Colorado (DC/ILB)
- 2021: Florida (DA)
- 2022–2024: Western Kentucky (DC/S)
- 2025–2026: Colorado State (Interim HC/DC)

Head coaching record
- Overall: 5–16

Tyson Summers (born April 11, 1980) is an American college football coach who was most recently the defensive coordinator for Colorado State University. He previously served as the defensive coordinator at Western Kentucky University and as an analyst at University of Florida. Prior to that, Summers served as the defensive coordinator at the University of Colorado Boulder. Summers was the head football coach at Georgia Southern University from 2016 to 2017.

== Playing career ==
A four-year letterwinner at Presbyterian College, Summers earned All-South Atlantic Conference honors as a linebacker in 1999 and was selected as team captain as a senior. He received his bachelor's degree in political science from Presbyterian in 2002.

== Coaching career ==
Summers began his coaching career in 2002 at Tift County High School in Tifton, Georgia, his alma mater. He then returned to Presbyterian in 2003, this time as defensive backs coach.

After serving as a graduate assistant at Troy (then Troy State) and Georgia, Summers coached safeties at Georgia Southern in 2006 before coaching linebackers and eventually safeties at UAB for five seasons under Neil Callaway, the offensive coordinator/offensive line coach at Georgia while Summers was a GA with the Bulldogs.

From 2012-2014, Summers was on the staff at UCF, eventually being named defensive coordinator and overseeing a unit that ranked 5th in the country in total defense in 2014.

In 2015, Summers reunited with another former Georgia assistant, Mike Bobo, at Colorado State, where he was the defensive coordinator and safeties coach.

On December 21, 2015, Summers returned to Georgia Southern as the program's 14th head coach and 2nd in the Eagles' FBS era, replacing Willie Fritz, who left for the same position at Tulane. Despite winning their first three games in the 2016 season, the Eagles went just 2-7 the rest of the way to finish 5-7, their first losing season since 2009. Their conference mark was 4-4, good for 6th in the Sun Belt Conference.

Summers' second season in Statesboro opened with a 41-7 loss at then-No. 12 Auburn. The next week, in Birmingham, Alabama, Georgia Southern lost to FCS program New Hampshire, 22-12, followed by losses against Indiana, Arkansas State, and New Mexico State. On October 22, 2017, a day after a 55-20 loss at UMass dropped the Eagles to 0-6 on the season, Summers was fired and replaced by assistant coach Chad Lunsford.

For the 2018 season, Summers returned to Georgia, joining Kirby Smart's staff as a defensive quality control coach. In 2019, he was named defensive coordinator at Colorado under Mel Tucker and was retained by Karl Dorrell after Tucker's departure, but was fired after two seasons.

In 2021, Summers was a defensive assistant at Florida.

On February 13, 2022, Summers was named the defensive coordinator at Western Kentucky. Longtime collegiate and professional coach Kim Helton, the father of WKU's head coach, Tyson Helton, was on Neil Callaway's staff at UAB with Summers from 2007-2011; the elder Helton also coached Summers' father, Andy, at Florida in the 1970s. Clay Helton, Tyson Helton's older brother, is the current head coach of Summers' former Georgia Southern program.

In 2025, Summers returned to Colorado State as the defensive coordinator. Midway through the 2025 season, head coach Jay Norvell was fired, and Summers was named interim head coach for the remainder of the season. New head coach Jim Mora retained Summers for the 2026 season. During a game against Oregon State that season, Summers was relieved of his defensive play calling abilities and walked off the field. Mora later confirmed that Summers was "no longer with the program" after leaving the game altogether.

== Head coaching record ==
| Year | Team | Overall | Conference | Standing |
|---|---|---|---|---|
Georgia Southern Eagles (Sun Belt Conference) (2016–2017)
| 2016 | Georgia Southern | 5–7 | 4–4 | 6th |
| 2017 | Georgia Southern | 0–6 (Note: Georgia Southern fired Summers after 6 games.) | 0–2 | |
| Georgia Southern: | | 5–13 | 4–6 | |
Colorado State Rams (Mountain West Conference) (2025)
| 2025 | Colorado State | 0–5 (Note: Summers replaced Jay Norvell after seven games) | 0–5 | 12th |
| Colorado State: | | 0–5 | 0–5 | |
| Total: | | 5–18 | | |
