= Georgia Museum of Agriculture & Historic Village =

Living museum in Tifton, Georgia, US

Coordinates: 31.46531°N 83.53518°W

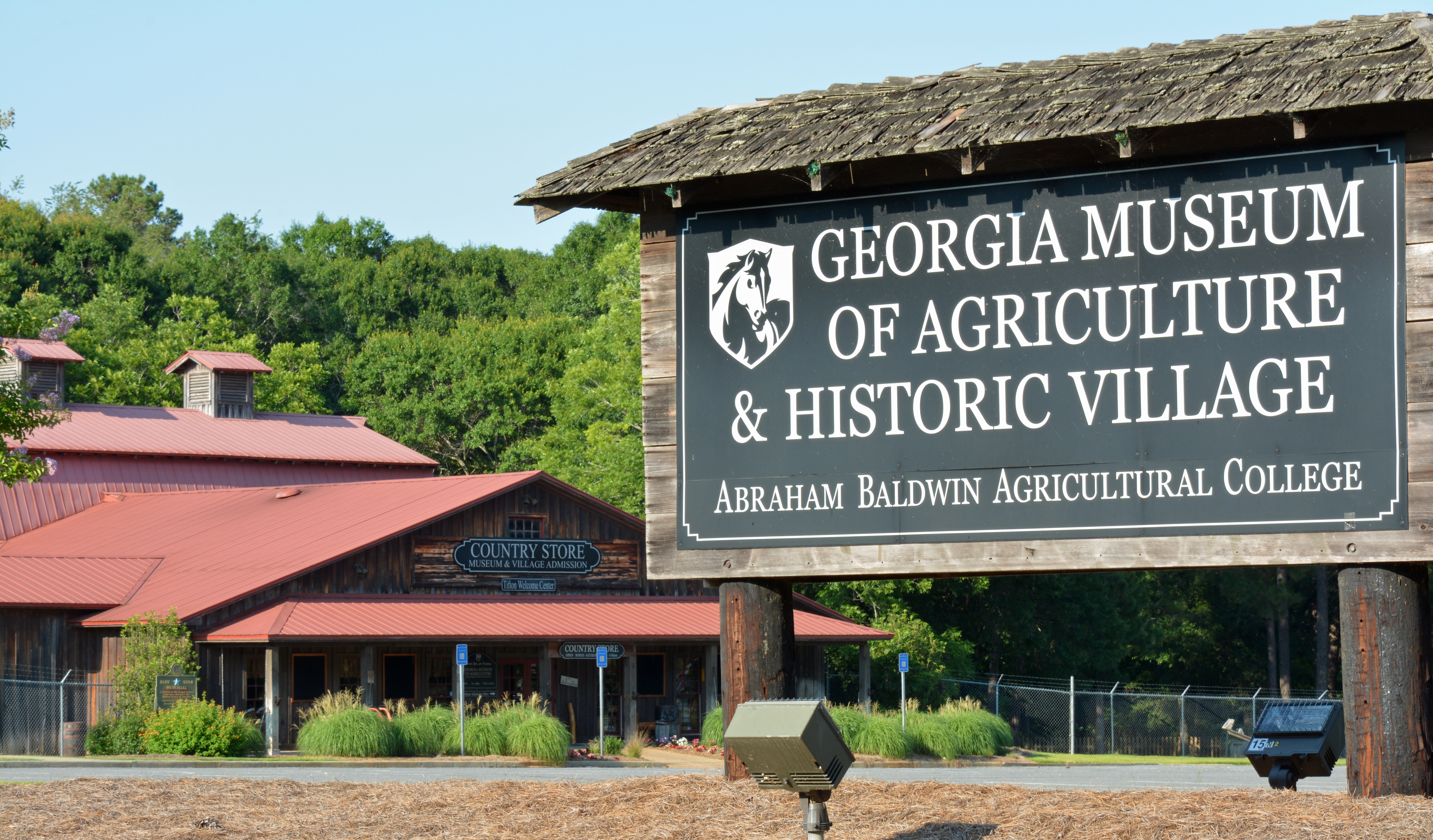
Sign and building to purchase tickets

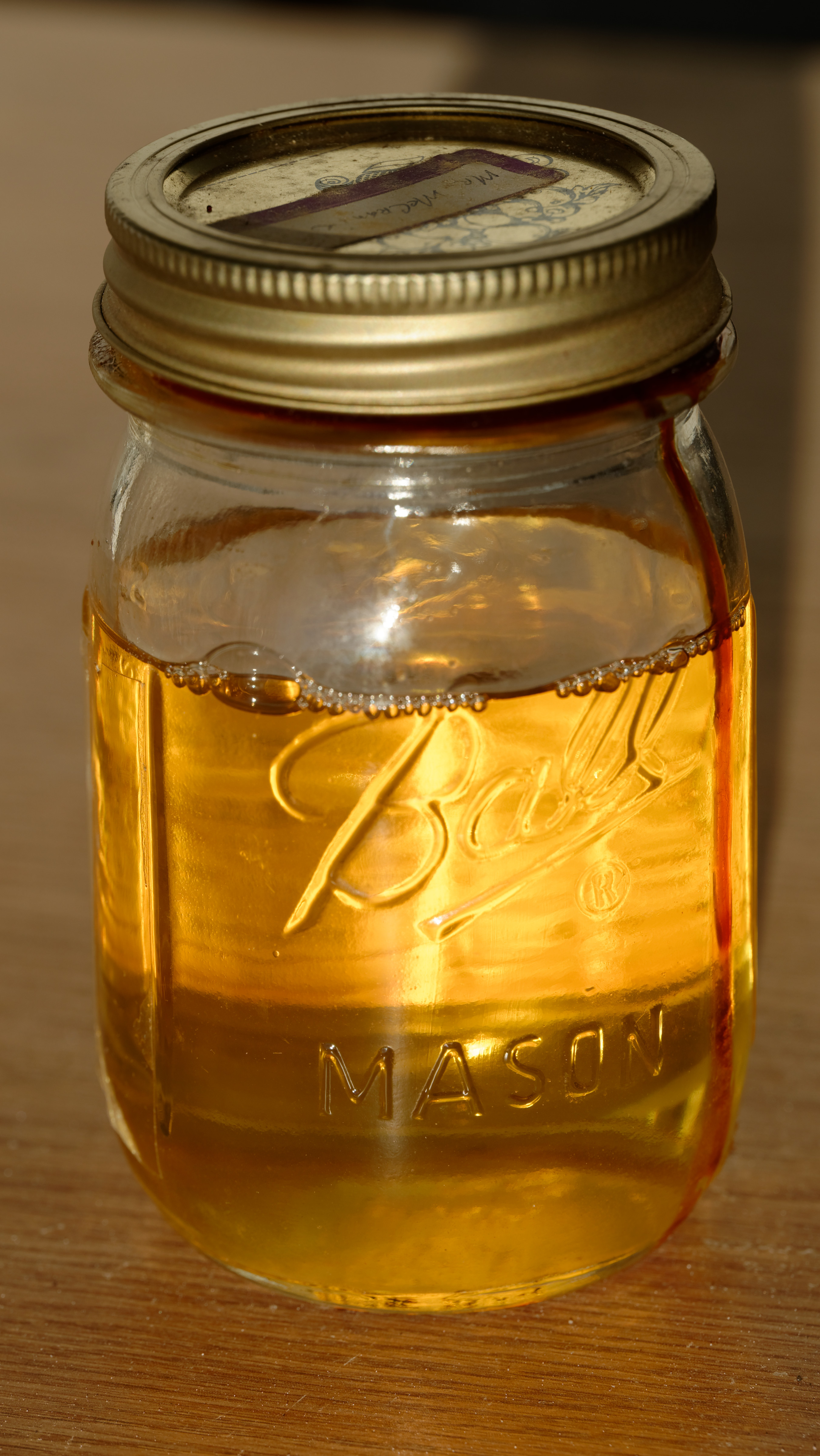
Turpentine distilled here as it was circa 1900

The Georgia Museum of Agriculture & Historic Village, formerly known as Agrirama, is a 19th-century living museum located in Tifton, Georgia. It opened on July 4, 1976. The grounds consist of five areas: a traditional farm community of the 1870s, an 1890s progressive farmstead, an industrial sites complex, rural town, national peanut complex, and the Museum of Agriculture Center.

Over 35 structures have been relocated to the 95-acre (380,000 m^{2}) site and faithfully restored or preserved including the Vulcan Steam Train running on 3 ft (914 mm) narrow gauge track. Costumed interpreters explain and demonstrate the lifestyle and activities of this time in Georgia's history. It is located at 1392 Whiddon Mill Road off I-75 at Exit 63B.

The museum is a facility of Abraham Baldwin Agricultural College.

== Notable facilities ==
Like many living museums, this one includes residences, a grist mill, saw mill and stores. More notable demonstrations include a turpentine still and a cotton gin.

The cotton gin is a reconstruction designed to demonstrate ginning technologies of the period 1890–1900. During this period, mid-nineteenth century gins were being replaced by the system gin invented by Robert S. Munger. This gin demonstrates all the system ginning technologies, but does not operate as efficiently as a system gin because it only contains one gin stand. Its equipment was made by Lummus of Columbus, Georgia. In 1999, Lummus moved to Savannah, Georgia, where it continues to make cotton gins. The museum operates the gin for the public annually.
