= Tift County High School =

Public high school in Tifton, Georgia, United States

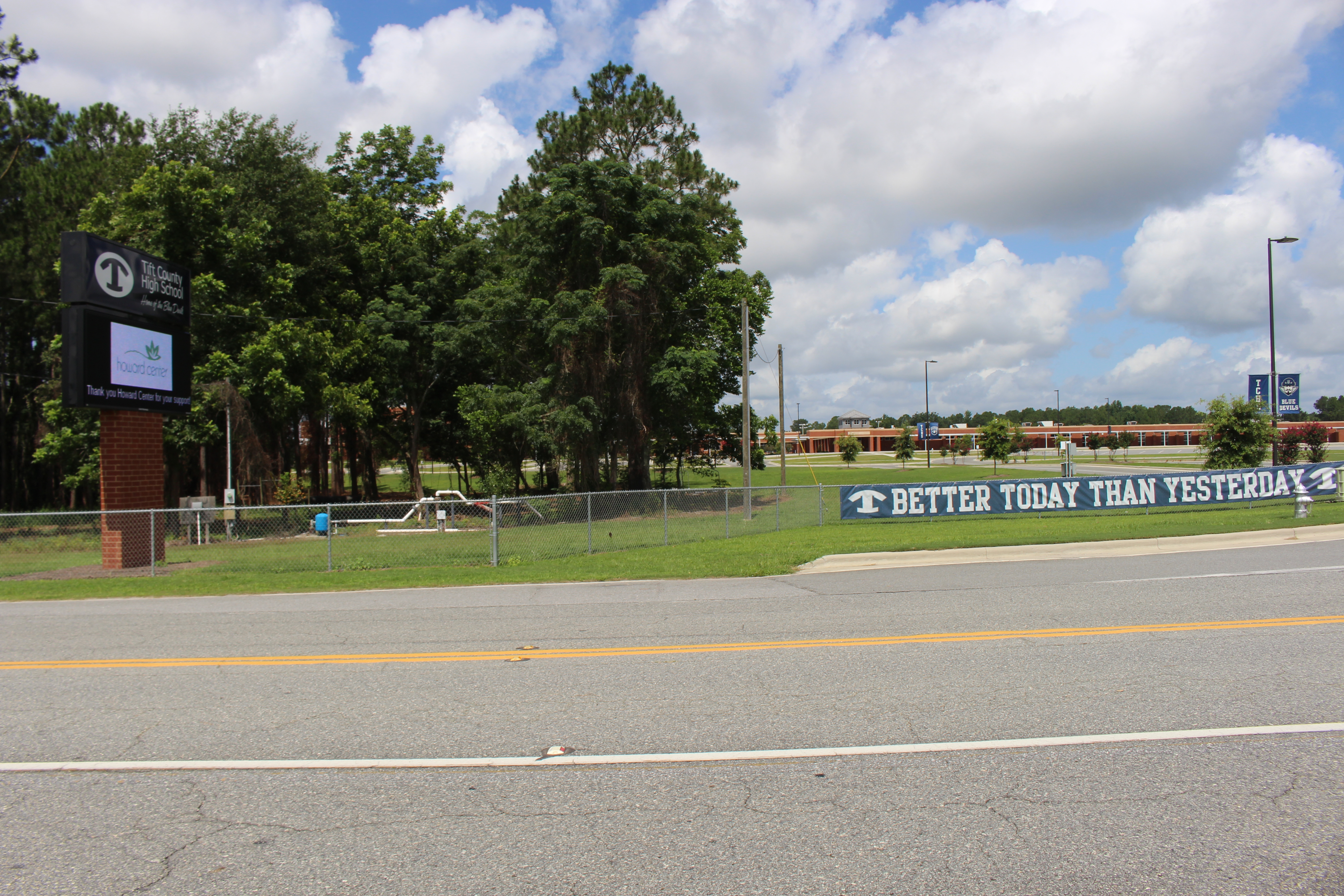

Location
- 1 Blue Devil Way; Tifton, Georgia 31794; United States; 31°28′13″N 83°28′36″W

Information
- School type: Public high school
- School district: Tift County School District
- Superintendent: Natalie Gore
- Administrator: Chanon Collins, Ed.D, Assistant Principal Matt Colson, Assistant Principal Russ Davis, Assistant Principal Patty Walters, Assistant Principal Bradley Winger, Assistant Principal Chris Martin, Athletics Director Donald Gilman, Ph.D, CTAE Director
- Principal: Jennifer Johnson (soon-to-be)
- Teaching staff: 126.30 (FTE)
- Grades: 9–12
- Gender: Co-ed
- Student to teacher ratio: 17.47
- Colors: Blue and white
- Fight song: TCHS Fight Song
- Athletics: GHSA Class AAAAAAA
- Sports: Football, softball, basketball, track and field, cross country, golf, swimming, baseball, competition cheerleading, gymnastics, tennis, soccer
- Mascot: Blue Devil
- Nickname: Big Blue
- Team name: TCHS Blue Devils
- Information: (229) 387-2475
- Website: https://tchs.tiftschools.com/o/tchs

Tift County High School is a public high school located in Tifton, Georgia, United States. It serves grades 9-12 in the Tift County School District. The school mascot is the Blue Devil. In 2018, the Tift County School District was ranked the 15th safest in Georgia.

== TCHS football ==
TCHS plays in the GHSA class 1-AAAAAAA at Brodie Field. They have won one state championship and have gone to the semi-finals six times. The current head coach is Noel Dean. Tift County High School shares a region with Colquitt County HS, Lowndes HS and Camden County HS.

== School sports ==
Tift County High School has the following teams:

- Baseball
- Basketball
- Cheerleading
- Cross country
- Football
- Golf
- Soccer
- Softball
- Swimming
- Tennis
- Track & field
- Volleyball
- Winter guard
- Wrestling

=== State Titles ===
- Boys' Basketball (3) - 1996(4A), 2014(6A), 2017(7A)
- Football (1) - 1983 (4A)
- Boys' Golf (3) - 1995(4A), 1996(4A), 1997(4A)
- Girls' Golf (1) - 2011(5A)
- Gymnastics (2) - 2011(All), 2012(All)
- Slow Pitch Softball (5) - 1987(4A), 1988(4A), 1989(4A), 1990(4A), 1996(4A)

== School band ==
In December 2011, the Blue Devil Brigade represented the state of Georgia at the 70th Anniversary of the bombing of Pearl Harbor in Honolulu, HI. They even won the Grand Championship at the Pearl Harbor Memorial Parade, and Rickey L. Savage, the band director at the time, was awarded the flag that flew over the U.S.S. Arizona Memorial by the booster organization.

== Notable alumni ==
- Rashod Bateman - 1st round NFL Draft pick #27 over all pick, current number one slot WR for Baltimore Ravens
- Nanci Bowen - LPGA major winner
- Larry Dean - former NFL player for the Minnesota Vikings
- Todd Fordham - former NFL player for the Jacksonville Jaguars, Pittsburgh Steelers and Carolina Panthers
- Nick Green - pitcher for the Milwaukee Brewers
- Roy Hart - former NFL and CFL player
- Kip Moore - Country Music singer
- Clay Shiver - All-American football player, member of Florida State University's all-time football team, and player for the Dallas Cowboys of the NFL
- Tyson Summers - Head Football Coach, Georgia Southern University
- Cyndi Thomson - country singer
- Dina Titus - U.S. Congresswoman representing Nevada, former Nevada state senator, and the 2006 Democratic nominee for governor of Nevada
- Tyre West – NFL defensive end for the Detroit Lions
