= Wildcat Stadium (Fort Valley, Georgia) =

Stadium in Fort Valley, Georgia

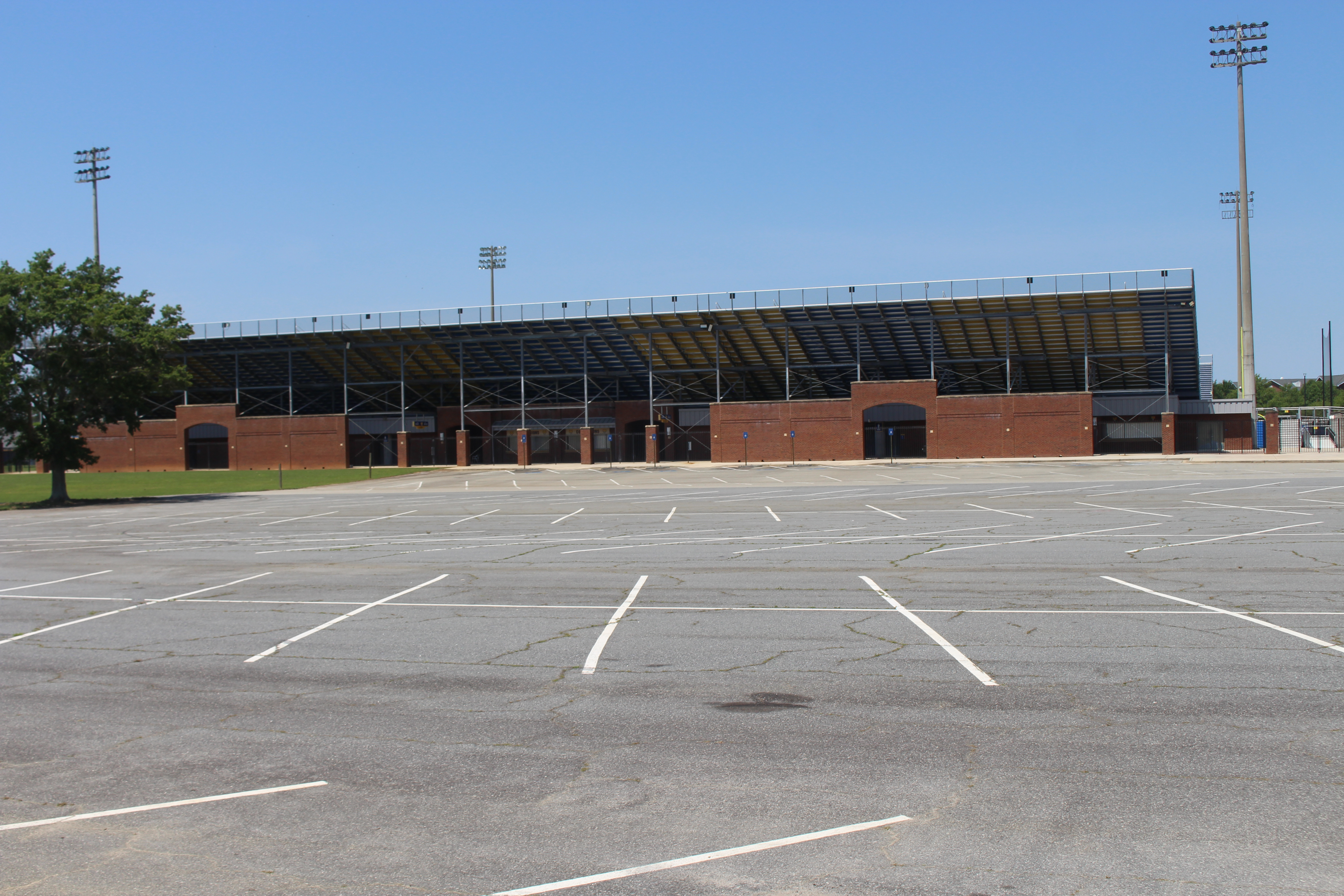
- Interactive map of Wildcat Stadium
- Location: Fort Valley, Georgia
- Coordinates: 32°32′1″N 83°53′43″W
- Owner: Fort Valley State University
- Capacity: 10,000
- Scoreboard: Yes

Construction
- Groundbreaking: November 2008
- Built: November 2008 – August 2009
- Opened: August 28–29, 2009
- Cost: $9 million
- Architects: Ellis, Ricket & Associates
- Project manager: Hal Gibson Companies
- General contractor: Wilkinson Construction Company Inc.

Tenant
- Fort Valley State University

Wildcat Stadium is a 10,000-seat stadium in Fort Valley, Georgia, United States. It is primarily used for American football, and is the home field of Fort Valley State University. The stadium was built in 2008–2009, and renovated in 2021. The home team at this stadium are the Fort Valley State Wildcats.
