= Tift County School District =

School district in Tifton, Georgia, U.S.

Address
- 207 North Ridge Avenue Tifton, Georgia, 31794-4323; United States
- Coordinates: 31.465°N 83.511°W

District information
- Grades: Pre-K through 12
- Superintendent: Natalie Gore
- Accreditation(s): Southern Association of Colleges and Schools; Georgia Accrediting Commission
- NCES District ID: 1304980

Students and staff
- Enrollment: 7,641
- Faculty: 467

Other information
- Website: tiftschools.com/

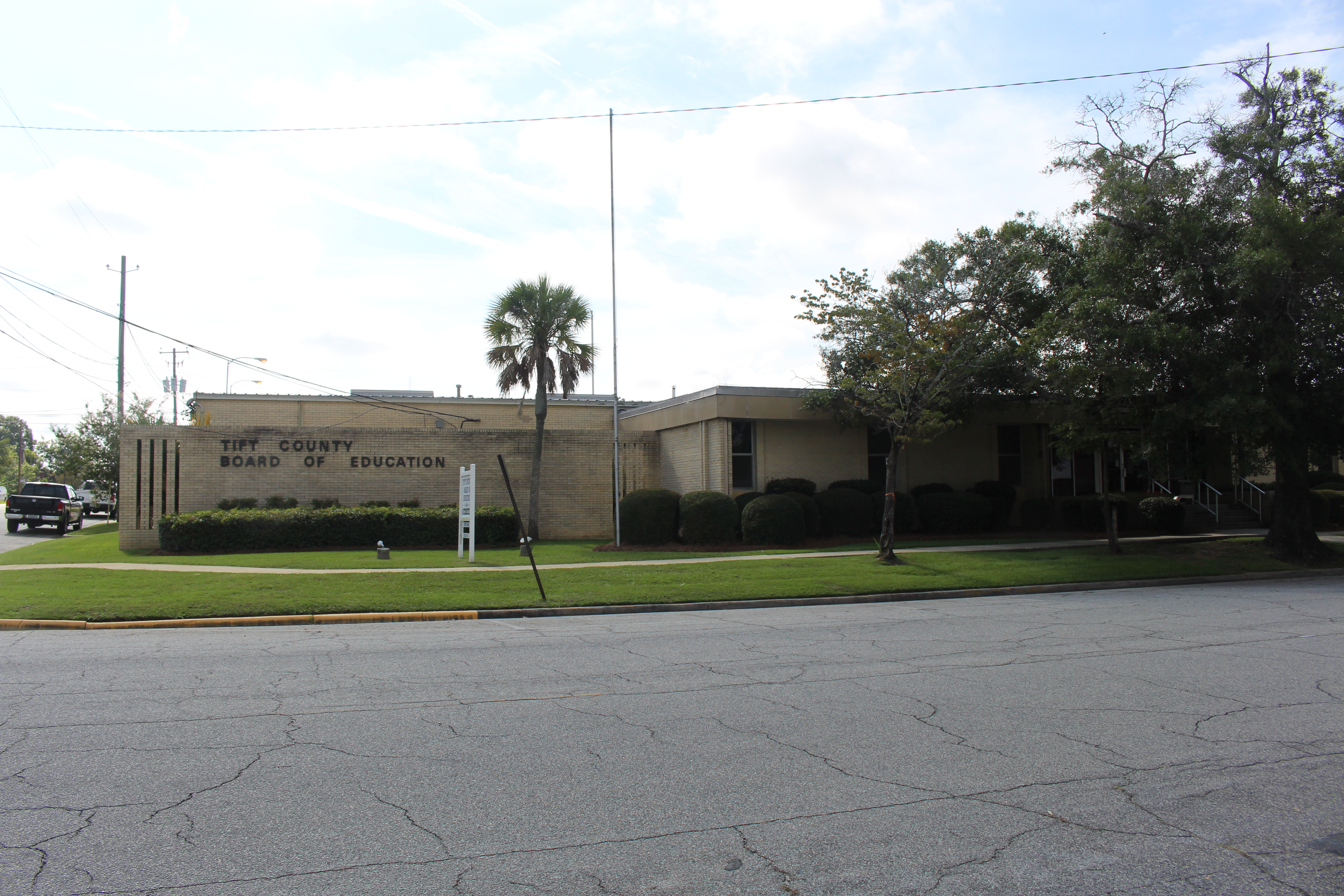
Tift County School District headquarters

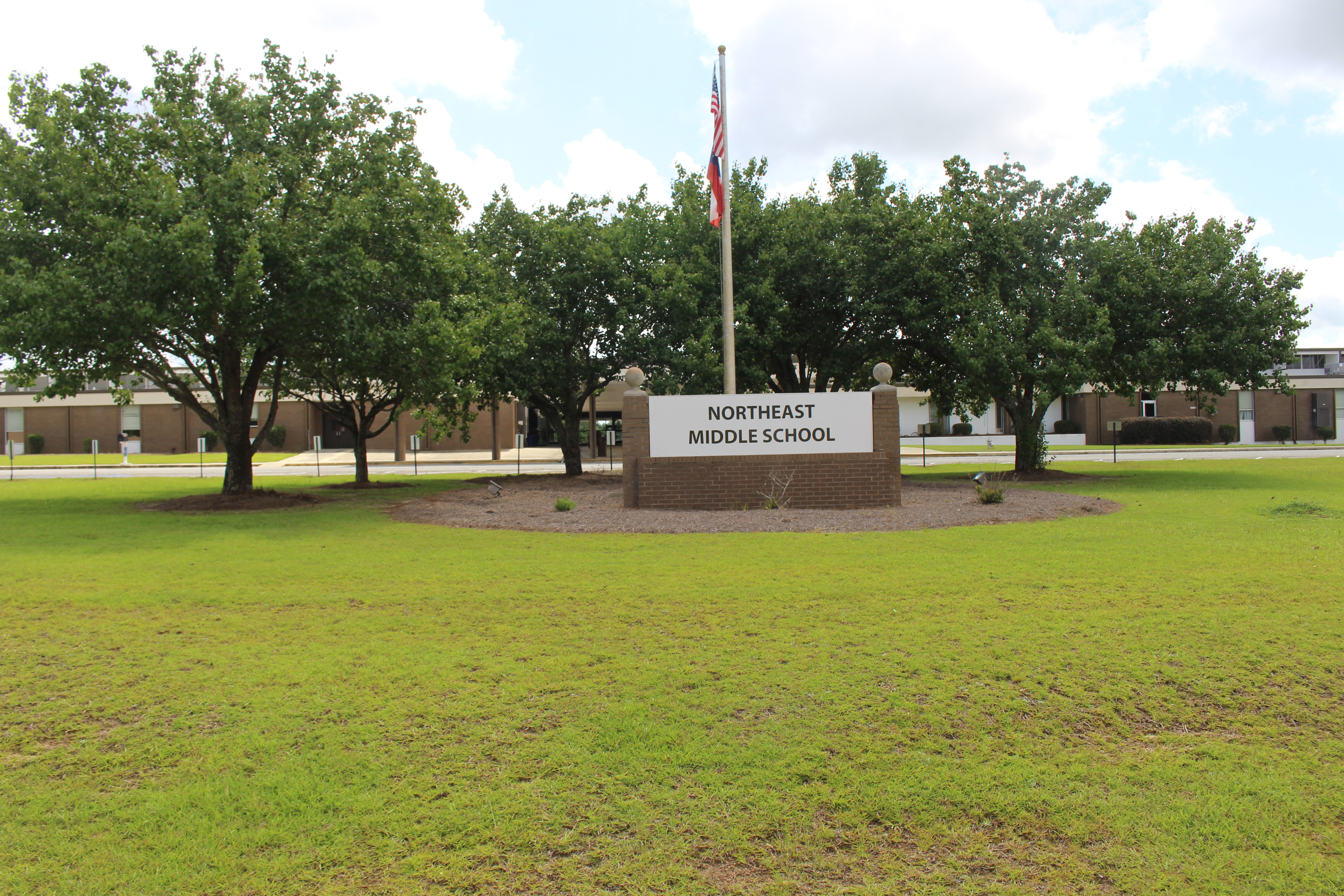
Northeast Middle School

The Tift County School District is a public school district in Tift County, Georgia, United States, based in Tifton. It serves the communities of Omega, Phillipsburg, Tifton, Ty Ty, and Unionville.

== Board of education ==
The following people make up the Tift County Government Board of Education

- Jonathan Jones, Chairperson - District 7
- Pat McKinnon - District 2 -
- Marilyn Burks, Vice Chairperson - District 1
- John Waddell - District 3
- Jamie Hill - District 4
- Sam Wright - District 5
- Rusty Harrelson - District 6

== Schools ==
The Tift County School District has a pre-K center, four primary schools, three elementary schools, two middle schools, one junior high school, one high school, and one alternative school.

In 2010, the Tift County Board of Education turned J. T. Reddick Elementary School into a 6th grade-only school. In 2018, schools have been configured for grades K-5, 6-8 and 9–12. The new configuration will require that a new ninth grade wing be constructed at Tift County High School.

=== High schools ===
- Tift County High School (9-12th grades)

=== Middle schools (6-8) ===
- Eighth Street Middle School
- Northeast Middle School

=== Elementary (K-5) ===
- Annie Belle Clark Elementary School
- Charles Spencer Elementary School
- G.O Bailey Elementary School
- J. T. Reddick Elementary School
- Len Lastinger Elementary School
- Omega Elementary School (located in Omega, K-5th grade)
- Northside Primary School
- Matt Wilson Elementary School

=== Preschools ===
- Tift County Pre-K Center

=== Alternative schools ===
- Sixth Street Academy (9-12th grade)

== Gallery ==
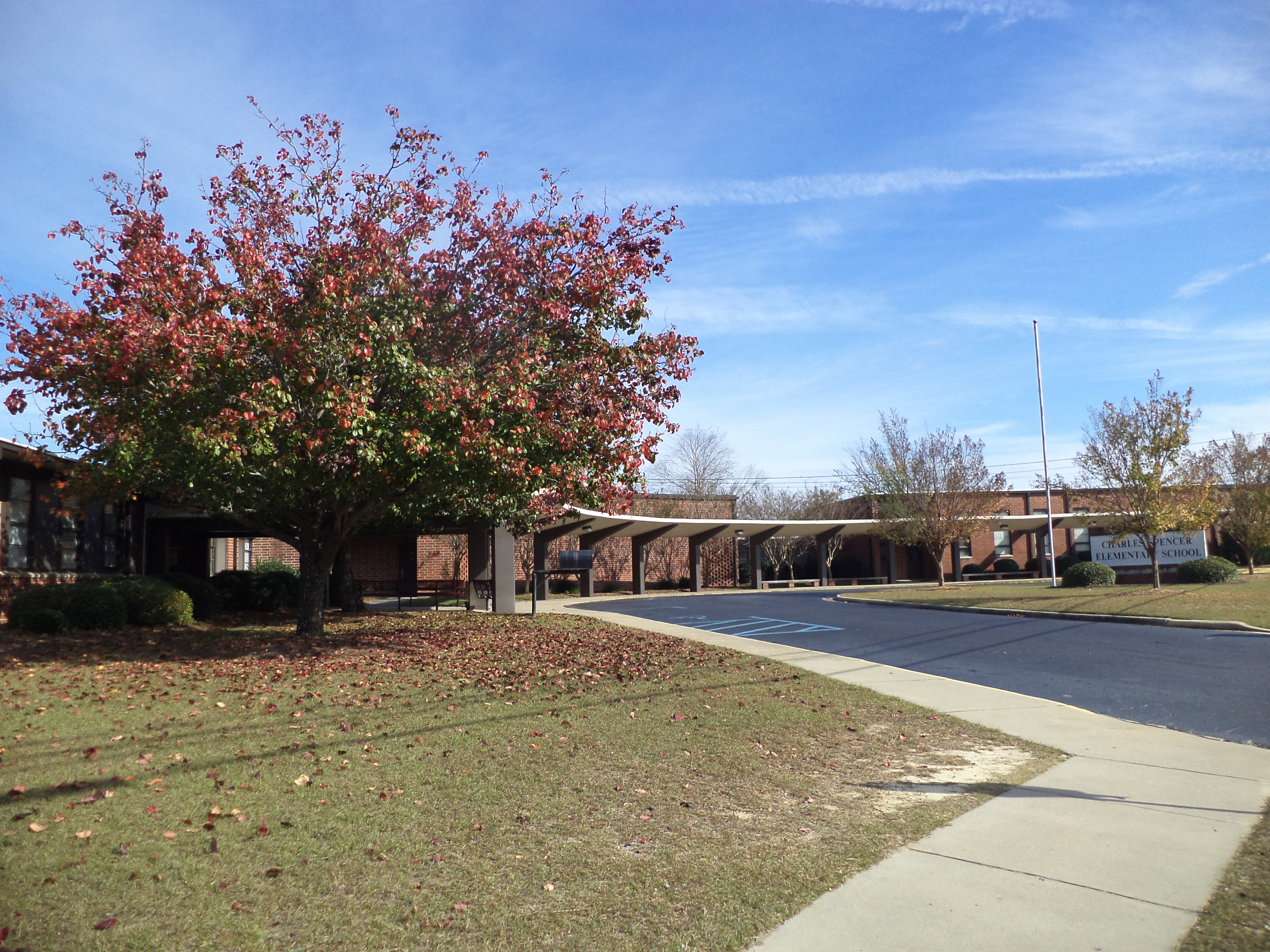
Charles Spencer Elementary School

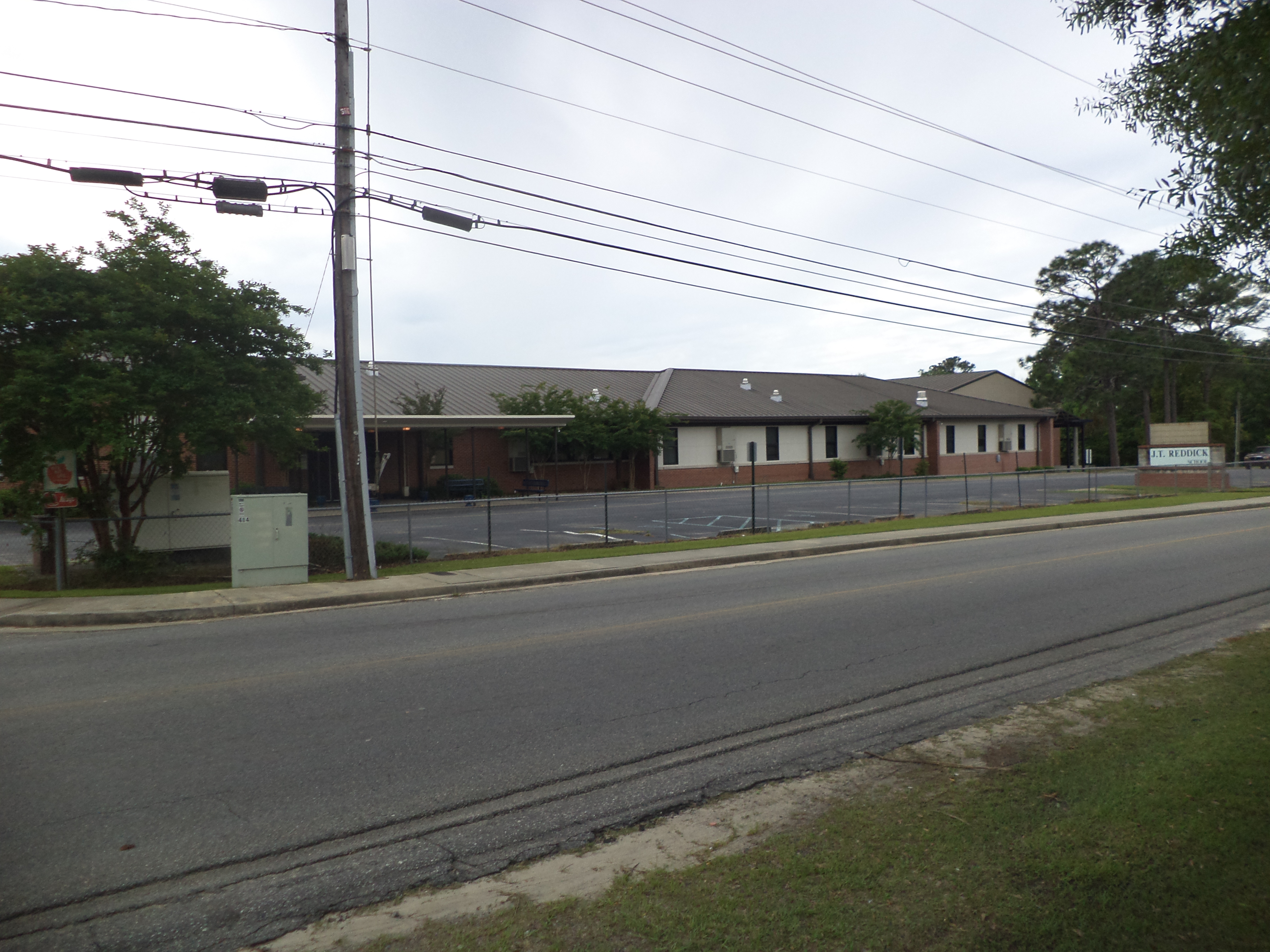
J. T. Reddick Elementary School

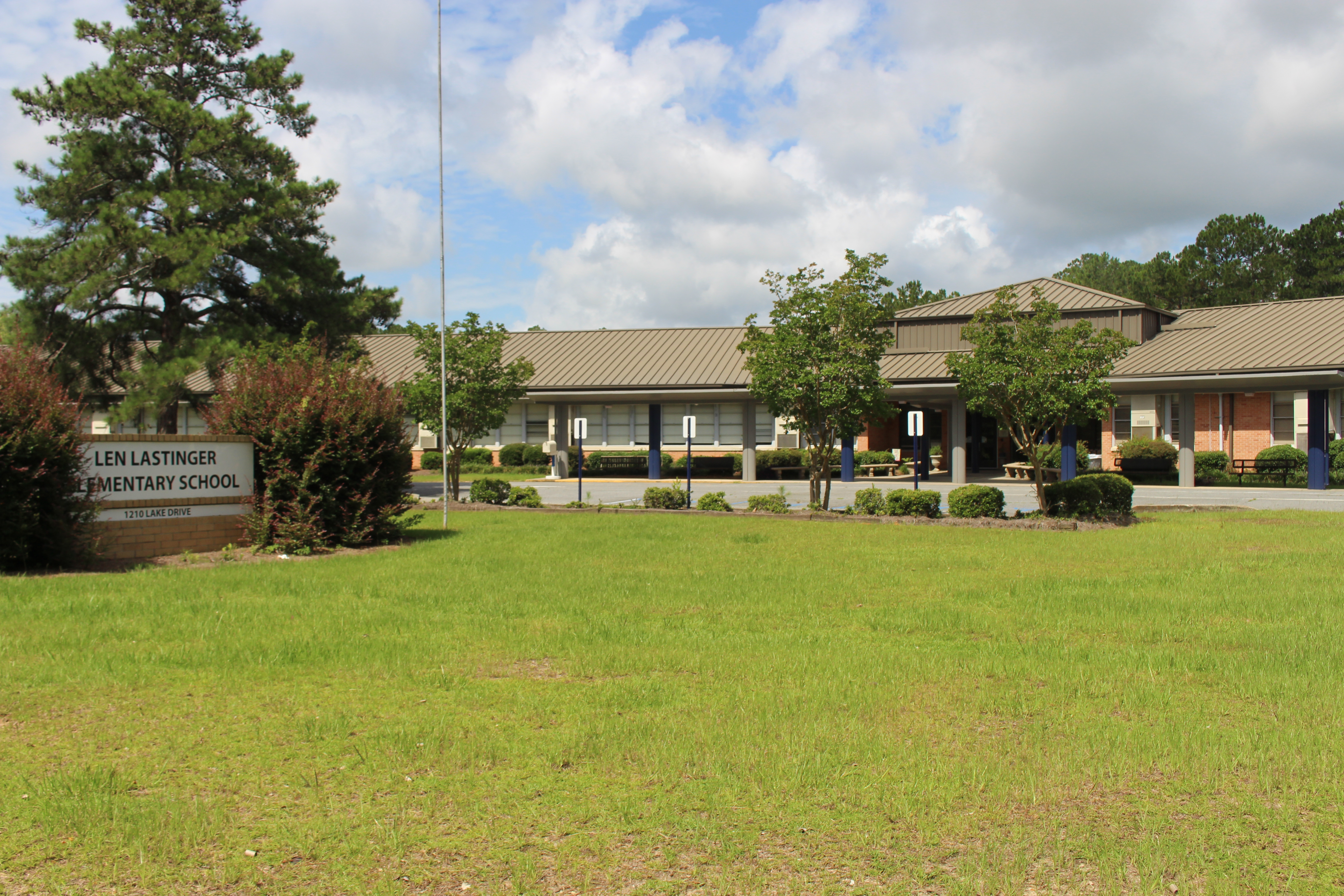
Len Lastinger Elementary School
