= Tiftarea Academy =

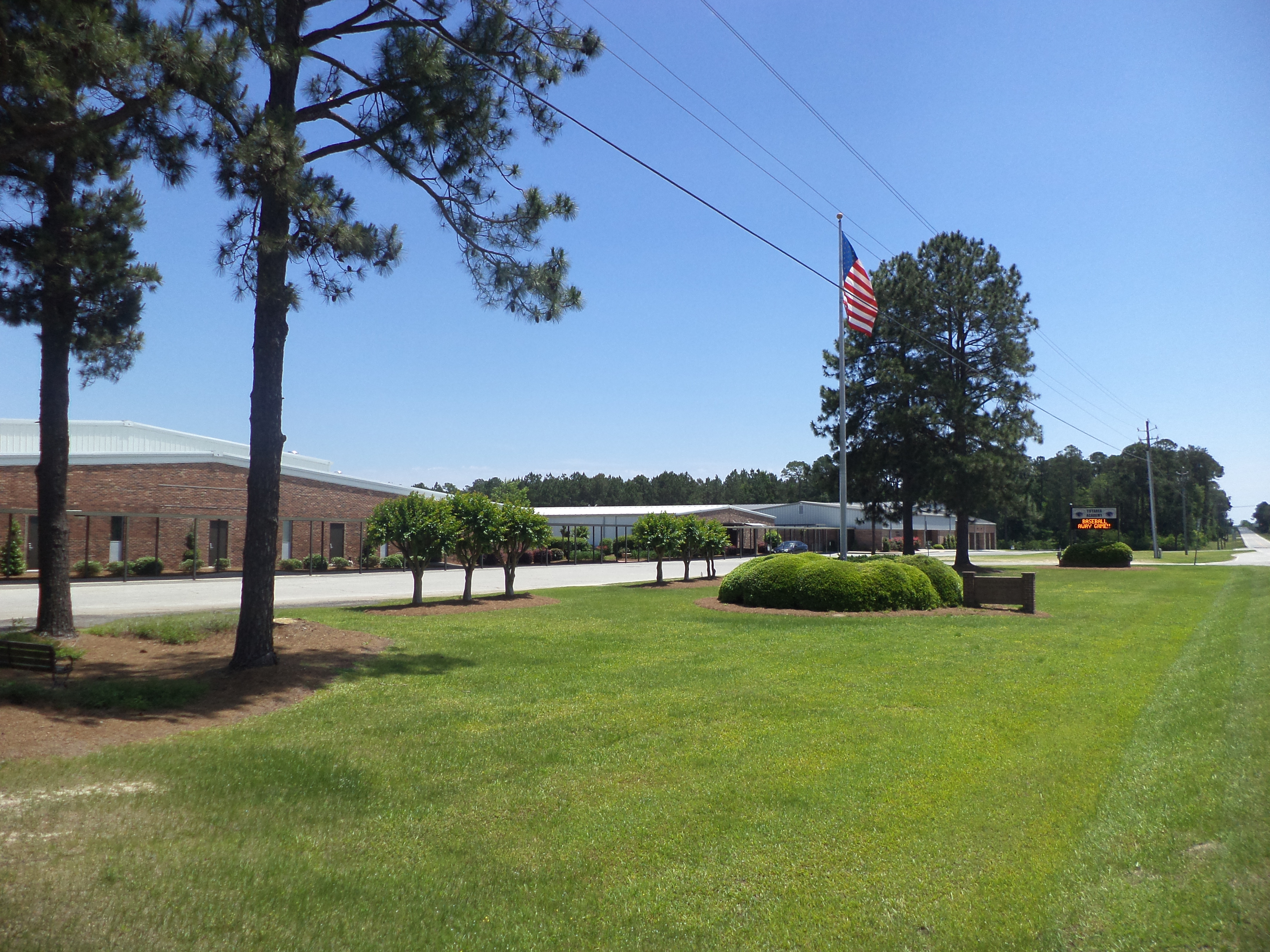

Location
- 3144 Highway 41 North; Chula, Georgia 31733; United States; 31.5413056°N 83.5350128°W

Information
- Other name: TA
- Type: Private school
- Motto: Committed to Excellence
- Established: 1969
- Headmaster: Bill Shellnut
- Grades: PK–12
- Gender: Co-educational
- Colors: Gold and Blue
- Athletics conference: GISA Class AAA
- Mascot: Panther
- Nickname: Panthers
- Website: www.tiftareaacademy.com

Tiftarea Academy (TA) is a PK–12 co-educational private school in Chula, Georgia, United States.

== History ==
Tiftarea Academy was founded in response to the federally mandated racial desegregation of public schools. According to Mike Bowler of the Atlanta Journal-Constitution, in 1970, the school could be described as a segregation academy.

In 1972, the school did not enroll any black students. As of 2019, the academy's enrollment of 676 students included 2.4% Asians, 0.5% African Americans and 0.5% Hispanic students.
