= Tifton, Georgia =

City in Georgia, United States

- City
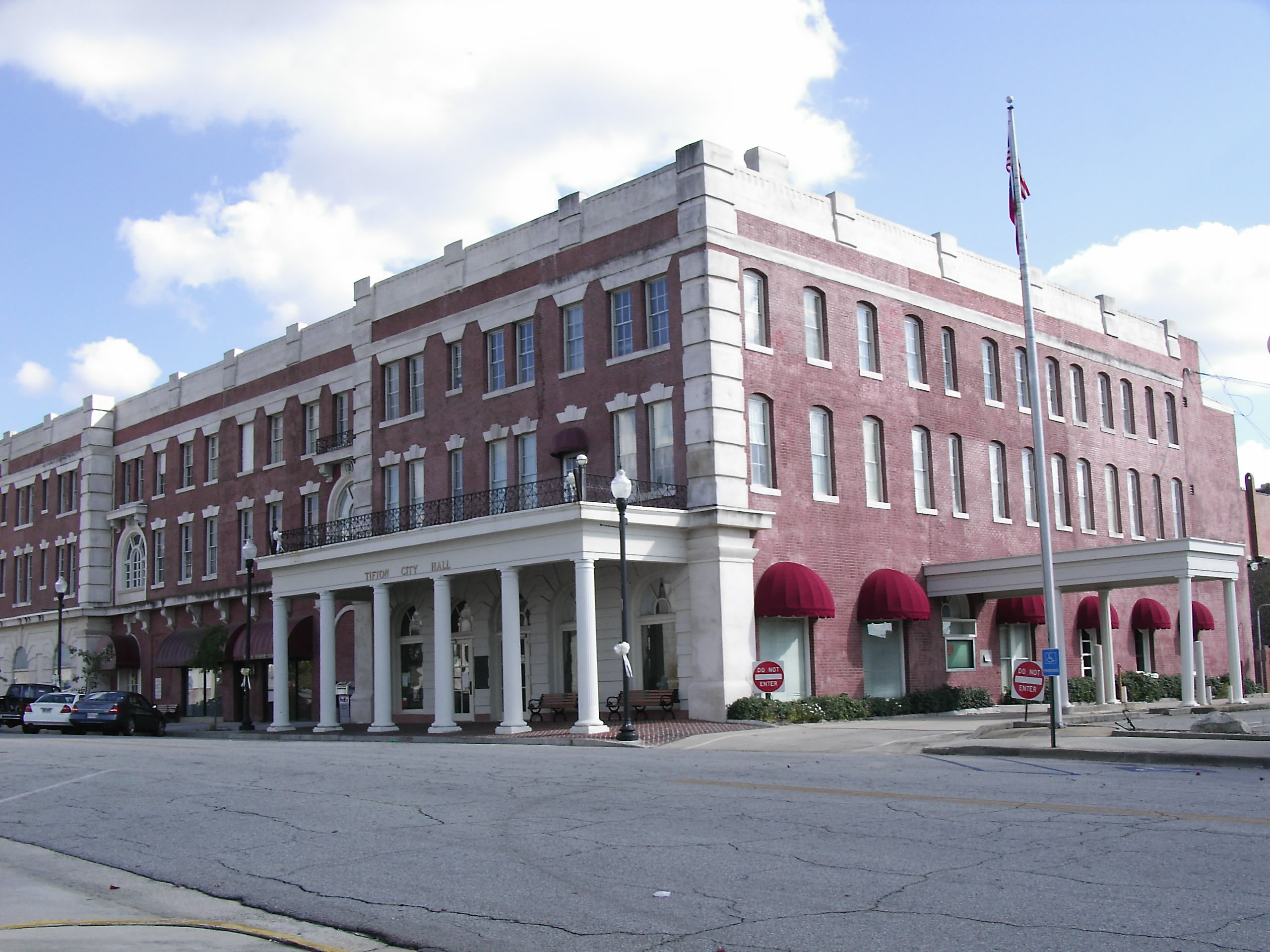
- Tifton City Hall

- Logo
- Nickname: Friendly City
- Location in Tift County and the state of Georgia
- Coordinates: 31°27′48″N 83°30′36″W
- Country: United States
- State: Georgia
- County: Tift

Government
  - Mayor: Julie Smith
  - City Manager: Larry Lawrence

Area
  - Total: 13.03 sq mi (33.76 km^{2})
  - Land: 12.84 sq mi (33.26 km^{2})
  - Water: 0.19 sq mi (0.50 km^{2})
- Elevation: 354 ft (108 m)

Population (2020)
  - Total: 17,045
  - Density: 1,327.2/sq mi (512.43/km^{2})
- Time zone: UTC-5 (EST)
  - Summer (DST): UTC-4 (EDT)
- ZIP codes: 31793-31794
- Area code: 229
- FIPS code: 13-76476
- GNIS feature ID: 0324159
- Website: tiftonga.gov

Tifton is a city in and the county seat of Tift County, Georgia, United States. The population was 17,045 at the 2020 census.

The area's public schools are administered by the Tift County School District. Abraham Baldwin Agricultural College has its main campus in Tifton. Southern Regional Technical College and the University of Georgia also have Tifton campuses.

Sites in the area include the Coastal Plain Research Arboretum, Abraham Baldwin Agricultural College, and the Georgia Museum of Agriculture & Historic Village. The Tifton Commercial Historic District and the Tifton Residential Historic District are listed on the National Register of Historic Places.

== History ==
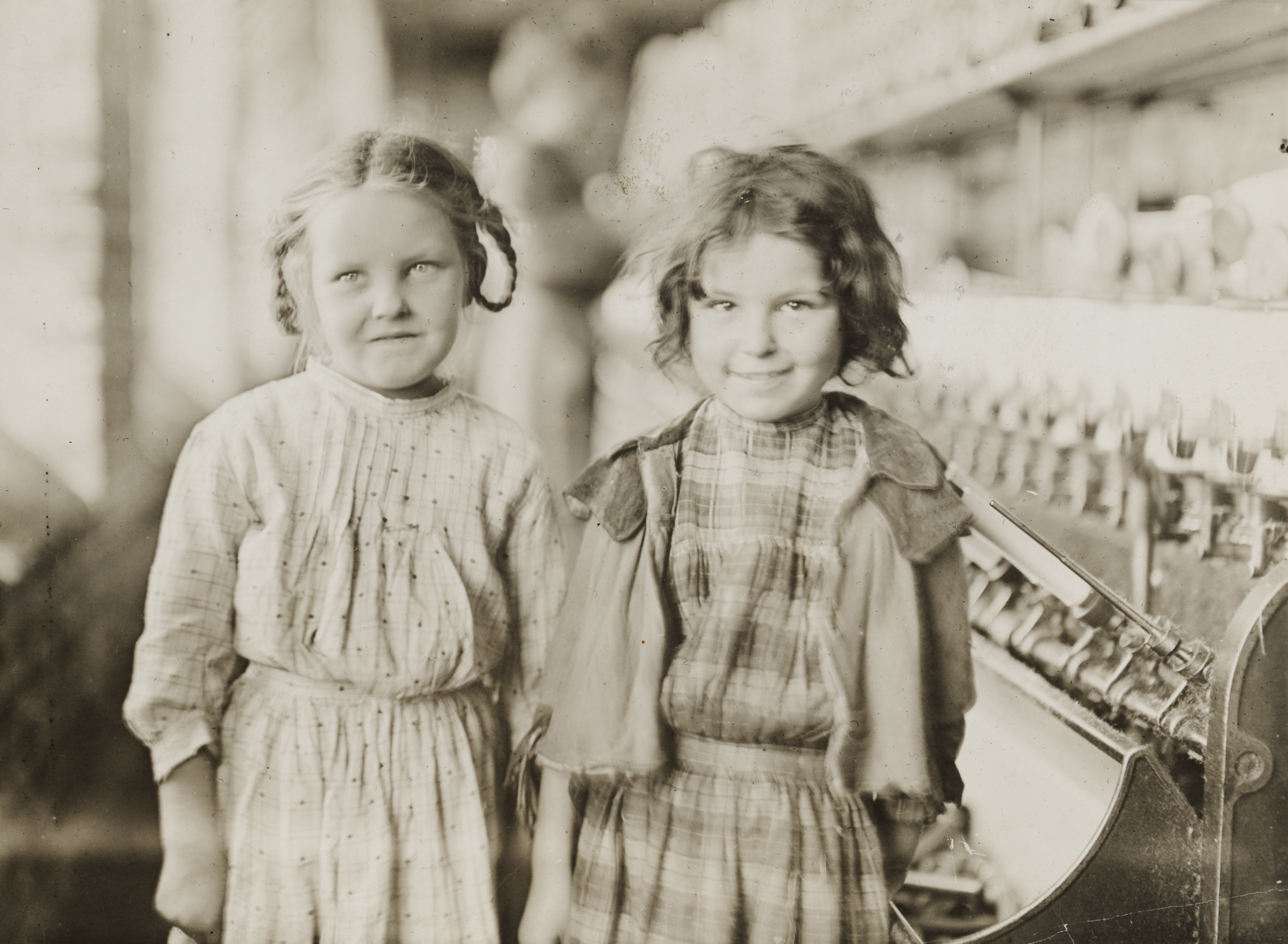
Child workers at Tifton Cotton Mills, 1909. Photographed by Lewis Hine.

Tifton was founded in 1872 in Berrien County at the junction of the Georgia Southern and Florida Railroad and the Brunswick and Western Railroad by sawmill owner Henry H. Tift. Tifton was incorporated as a city in 1890. In 1905, it was designated the county seat of the newly formed Tift County.

Several Chicago-Florida and Cincinnati-Florida passenger trains made stops in Tifton: the Atlantic Coast Line's Seminole, Flamingo and City of Miami and the Southern Railway's Ponce de Leon and Royal Palm. With the discontinuance of the City of Miami in 1971, Tifton was left without passenger service.

== Geography ==
Tifton is located in south central Georgia along Interstate 75, which runs north to south through the city, leading north 167 mi (269 km) to Atlanta and south 45 mi (72 km) to Valdosta. Other highways that pass through the city include U.S. Route 41, U.S. Route 82, U.S. Route 319, and Georgia State Route 125.

=== Climate ===
Tifton has a humid subtropical climate (Köppen: Cfa) with long, hot summers and short, mild winters.

Climate data for Tifton, Georgia, 1991–2020 normals, extremes 1911–present
Month	Jan	Feb	Mar	Apr	May	Jun	Jul	Aug	Sep	Oct	Nov	Dec	Year
Record high °F (°C)	83 (28)	90 (32)	90 (32)	93 (34)	99 (37)	105 (41)	104 (40)	104 (40)	106 (41)	98 (37)	88 (31)	84 (29)	106 (41)
Mean maximum °F (°C)	75.5 (24.2)	78.6 (25.9)	82.6 (28.1)	87.6 (30.9)	92.7 (33.7)	95.8 (35.4)	96.9 (36.1)	96.3 (35.7)	93.8 (34.3)	88.1 (31.2)	82.0 (27.8)	77.1 (25.1)	98.1 (36.7)
Mean daily maximum °F (°C)	58.7 (14.8)	63.8 (17.7)	69.0 (20.6)	75.4 (24.1)	84.0 (28.9)	87.9 (31.1)	90.0 (32.2)	89.4 (31.9)	85.8 (29.9)	77.1 (25.1)	68.3 (20.2)	62.6 (17.0)	76.0 (24.5)
Daily mean °F (°C)	47.6 (8.7)	52.0 (11.1)	57.3 (14.1)	63.7 (17.6)	72.2 (22.3)	77.6 (25.3)	80.1 (26.7)	79.6 (26.4)	75.5 (24.2)	66.1 (18.9)	56.5 (13.6)	51.1 (10.6)	64.9 (18.3)
Mean daily minimum °F (°C)	36.6 (2.6)	40.1 (4.5)	45.6 (7.6)	52.0 (11.1)	60.3 (15.7)	67.4 (19.7)	70.2 (21.2)	69.9 (21.1)	65.2 (18.4)	55.1 (12.8)	44.6 (7.0)	39.5 (4.2)	53.9 (12.2)
Mean minimum °F (°C)	22.8 (−5.1)	26.4 (−3.1)	29.7 (−1.3)	39.6 (4.2)	49.0 (9.4)	60.6 (15.9)	65.4 (18.6)	64.7 (18.2)	56.3 (13.5)	41.1 (5.1)	30.3 (−0.9)	26.3 (−3.2)	20.7 (−6.3)
Record low °F (°C)	0 (−18)	12 (−11)	16 (−9)	30 (−1)	39 (4)	48 (9)	54 (12)	54 (12)	42 (6)	28 (−2)	10 (−12)	6 (−14)	0 (−18)
Average precipitation inches (mm)	4.08 (104)	4.40 (112)	4.77 (121)	3.28 (83)	2.67 (68)	4.95 (126)	5.16 (131)	4.45 (113)	4.28 (109)	2.83 (72)	3.16 (80)	4.20 (107)	48.23 (1,226)
Average precipitation days (≥ 0.01 in)	8.7	8.1	7.7	6.5	6.9	11.5	12.4	12.4	7.9	6.2	5.9	7.4	101.6
Source 1: NOAA
Source 2: National Weather Service

== Demographics ==
Historical population
Census	Pop.	Note	%±
1900	1,384		—
1910	2,381		72.0%
1920	3,005		26.2%
1930	3,390		12.8%
1940	5,228		54.2%
1950	6,831		30.7%
1960	9,903		45.0%
1970	12,179		23.0%
1980	13,749		12.9%
1990	14,215		3.4%
2000	15,060		5.9%
2010	16,350		8.6%
2020	17,045		4.3%
U.S. Decennial Census; 1850-1870 1870-1880; 1890-1910 1920-1930; 1940 1950 1960; 1970 1980 1990; 2000 2010

=== Racial and ethnic composition ===
Tifton city, Georgia – Racial and ethnic composition Note: the US Census treats Hispanic/Latino as an ethnic category. This table excludes Latinos from the racial categories and assigns them to a separate category. Hispanics/Latinos may be of any race.
Race / Ethnicity (NH = Non-Hispanic)	Pop 2000	Pop 2010	Pop 2020	% 2000	% 2010	% 2020
White alone (NH)	8,852	8,069	7,367	58.78%	49.35%	43.22%
Black or African American alone (NH)	4,716	5,894	6,349	31.31%	36.05%	37.25%
Native American or Alaska Native alone (NH)	27	19	29	0.18%	0.12%	0.17%
Asian alone (NH)	245	311	434	1.63%	1.90%	2.55%
Native Hawaiian or Pacific Islander alone (NH)	4	8	0	0.03%	0.05%	0.00%
Other race alone (NH)	3	12	52	0.02%	0.07%	0.31%
Mixed race or Multiracial (NH)	74	176	523	0.49%	1.08%	3.07%
Hispanic or Latino (any race)	1,139	1,861	2,291	7.56%	11.38%	13.44%
Total	15,060	16,350	17,045	100.00%	100.00%	100.00%

=== 2020 census ===
As of the 2020 census, Tifton had a population of 17,045. The median age was 33.4 years. 25.9% of residents were under the age of 18 and 14.1% of residents were 65 years of age or older. For every 100 females there were 87.3 males, and for every 100 females age 18 and over there were 81.7 males age 18 and over.

98.3% of residents lived in urban areas, while 1.7% lived in rural areas.

There were 6,778 households in Tifton, including 3,779 families residing in the city. Of all households, 32.6% were married-couple households, 20.3% were households with a male householder and no spouse or partner present, and 40.0% were households with a female householder and no spouse or partner present. About 33.0% of all households were made up of individuals, 33.7% had children under the age of 18 living in them, and 12.8% had someone living alone who was 65 years of age or older.

There were 7,395 housing units, of which 8.3% were vacant. The homeowner vacancy rate was 1.7% and the rental vacancy rate was 5.9%.

== Arts and culture ==
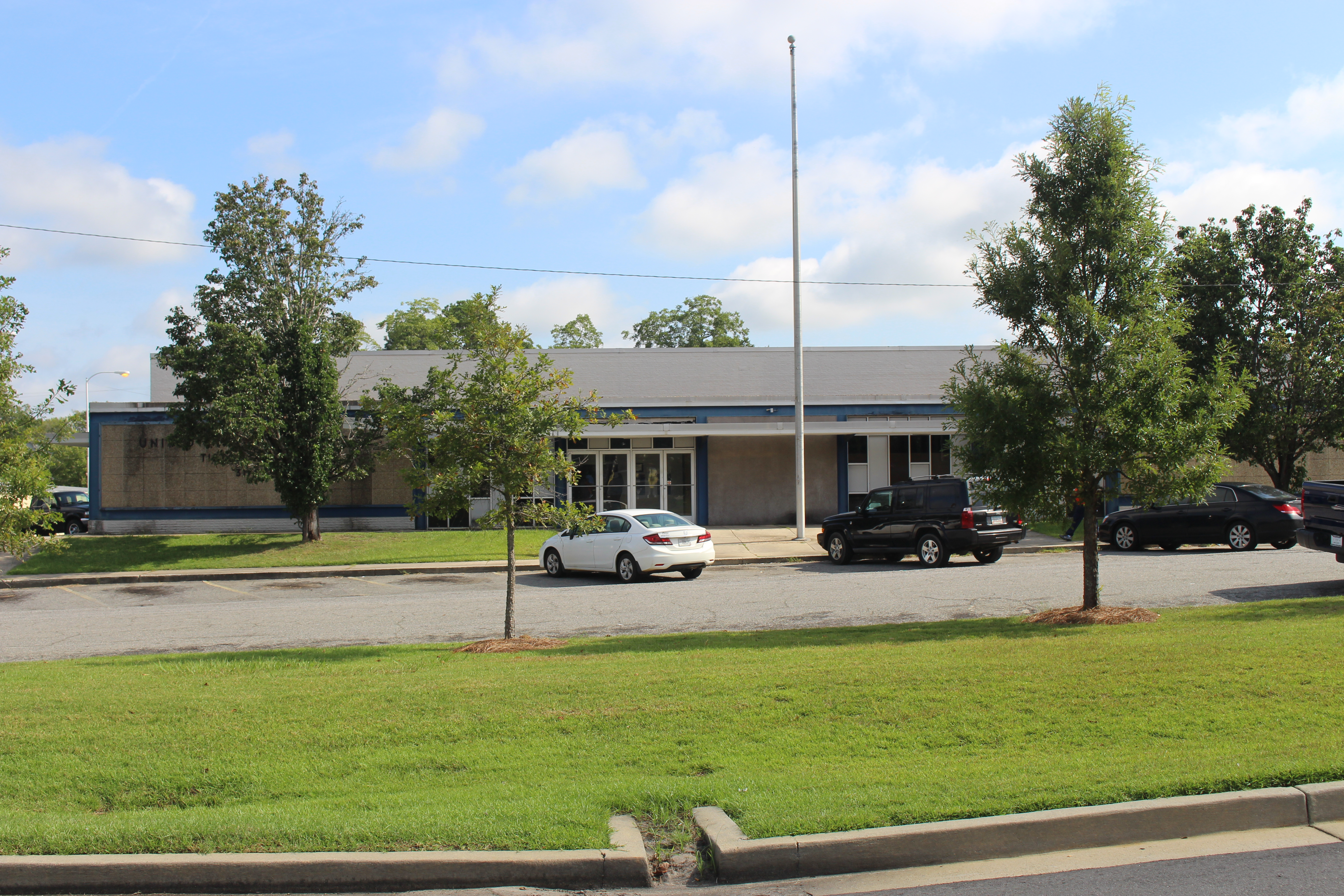
Tifton Post Office

=== Libraries ===
Tifton has a public library, in addition to an extensive college library located at nearby Abraham Baldwin Agricultural College.

=== Points of interest ===
- Coastal Plain Research Arboretum
- Georgia Museum of Agriculture & Historic Village

Until recently, Tifton was the home of the world's second-largest magnolia tree, which was located in Magnolia Tree Park. In 2004, the tree was burned in a fire. The cause of the fire has never been given by local authorities. Currently, the tree and observation area are blocked from visitors by a gate. Although it no longer grows, the tree still stands. It is not known where the new second-largest magnolia tree resides.

=== Georgia Museum of Agriculture and Historic Village ===
The Georgia Museum of Agriculture & Historic Village, formerly known as Agrirama, is located in Tifton, Georgia. It opened on July 4, 1976. The grounds consist of five areas: a traditional farm community of the 1870s, an 1890s progressive farmstead, an industrial site complex, a rural town, a national peanut complex, and the Museum of Agriculture Center. Over 35 structures have been relocated to the 95-acre (380,000 m^{2}) site and faithfully restored or preserved. Costumed interpreters explain and demonstrate the lifestyle and activities of this time in Georgia's history.

=== Historic districts ===
The Tifton Residential Historic District was listed on the National Register of Historic Places on April 30, 2008. It is bounded generally by 14th Street, Goff Street, 2nd Street and Forrest Avenue at coordinates 31°27′35″N 83°30′25″W. The Tifton Commercial Historic District and the Tift County Courthouse are also on the National Register.

== Sports ==
In 2000, the boys 10u baseball team won the state championship with an undefeated season (24–0).

In 2010, the indoor football team Georgia Firebirds relocated from Waycross, Georgia, to Tifton.

== Education ==
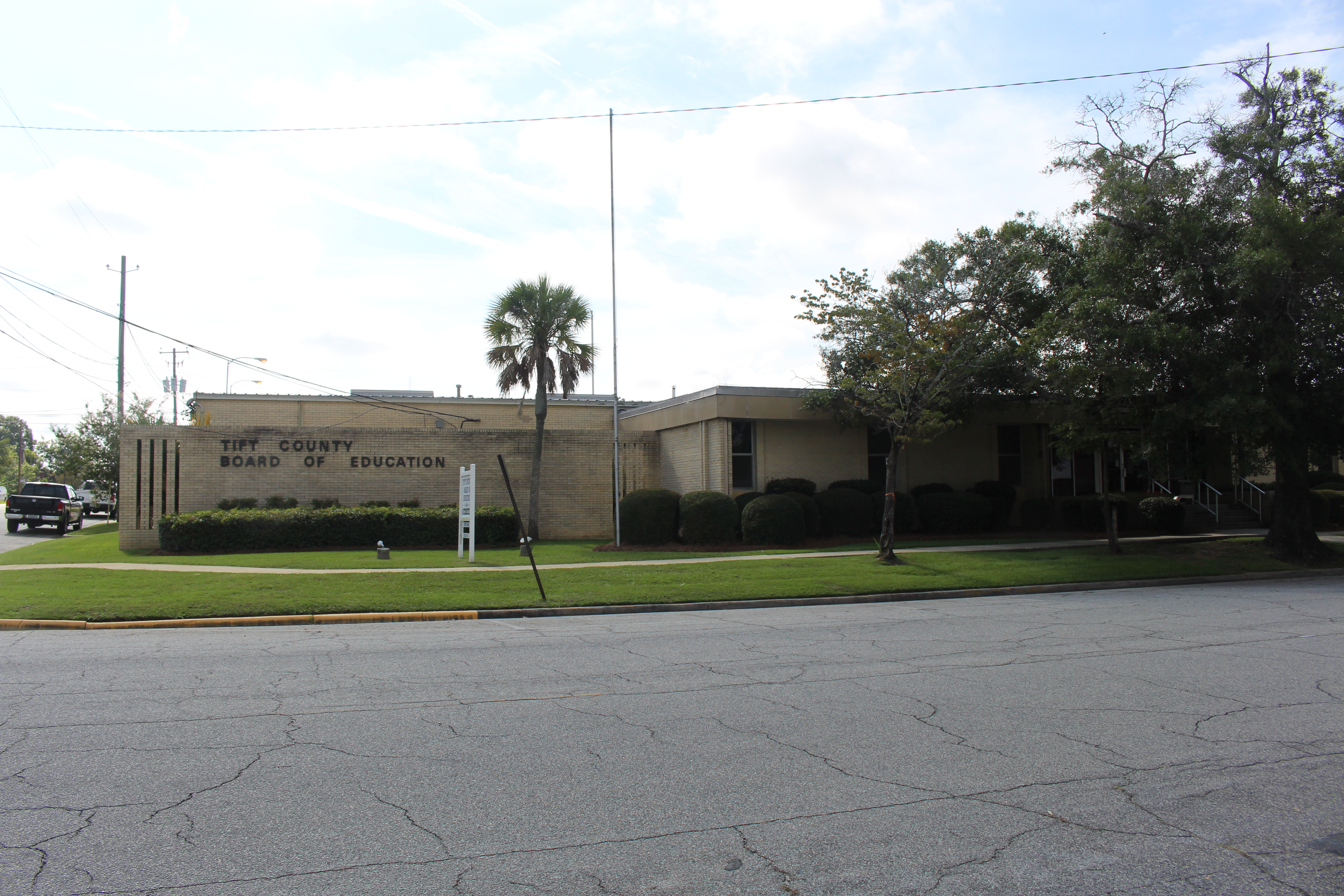
Tift County School District headquarters

=== Tift County School District ===
The Tift County School District holds pre-school to grade twelve, and consists of eight elementary schools, two middle schools, one high school, and an alternative school. The district has 467 full-time teachers and over 7,641 students.

=== Private schools ===
- Tiftarea Academy, located in Chula, Georgia (PK–12)
- Grace Baptist Christian School, Tifton

=== Higher education ===
- Abraham Baldwin Agricultural College - Main Campus
- Southern Regional Technical College - Tifton Campus
- University of Georgia - Tifton Agricultural Campus

== Media ==
The Tifton Gazette is a weekly newspaper published on Thursdays in Tifton, Georgia. It is operated by South Georgia Media Group, a division of Community Newspaper Holdings Inc. The Tifton Grapevine is a twice-weekly online newspaper with an email circulation of 8,600. It is operated by Sayles Unlimited Marketing.

== Infrastructure ==
Tifton water tower seen from I-75

=== Transportation ===
==== Major highways ====
- Interstate 75
- U.S. Highway 41
- U.S. Route 82
- U.S. Route 319
- State Route 125

==== Airports ====
- Henry Tift Myers Airport is a public airport located two miles (3.2 km) southeast of Tifton, serving the general aviation community, with no scheduled commercial airline service.

== Notable people ==
- Nanci Bowen - LPGA golfer
- Justin Brownlee - professional basketball player for the Barangay Ginebra San Miguel of the PBA
- Caitlin Carmichael - child actress
- Harold Cohen - US Army colonel during World War II and recipient of the Distinguished Service Medal
- Larry Dean - football linebacker for the Minnesota Vikings of the National Football League
- Dennis Dove - former MLB pitcher
- Harold Bascom Durham Jr., US Army 2d Lieutenant awarded the Medal of Honor
- Todd Fordham - former NFL offensive lineman
- Bob Hoffman - sports promoter
- Kip Moore, country music singer
- Matt Moore - former chairman of the South Carolina Republican Party
- Wyc Orr - politician and lawyer
- Ralph Puckett - US Army Colonel, Distinguished Graduate of the United States Military Academy, awarded Medal of Honor, Distinguished Service Cross (with oak leaf cluster), Silver Star (with oak leaf cluster), Legion of Merit (with 2 oak leaf clusters), etc.
- Austin Scott - U. S. Congressman representing Georgia's 8th congressional district
- Members of alternative rock band September Hase
- Clay Shiver -former NFL offensive lineman
- James "Chick" Stripling - Fiddler, comedian, and buck dancer
- Tyson Summers - American college football coach
- Cyndi Thomson - country music singer
- Dina Titus - U.S. Congresswoman representing Nevada's 1st congressional district
- Neil Norman - Associate Professor, College of William & Mary
- Rashod Bateman - football wide receiver for the Baltimore Ravens of the National Football League

== Sister city ==
- Linyi, China (2010)
