= Tifton Commercial Historic District =

Historic district in Georgia, United States

- U.S. National Register of Historic Places
- U.S. Historic district
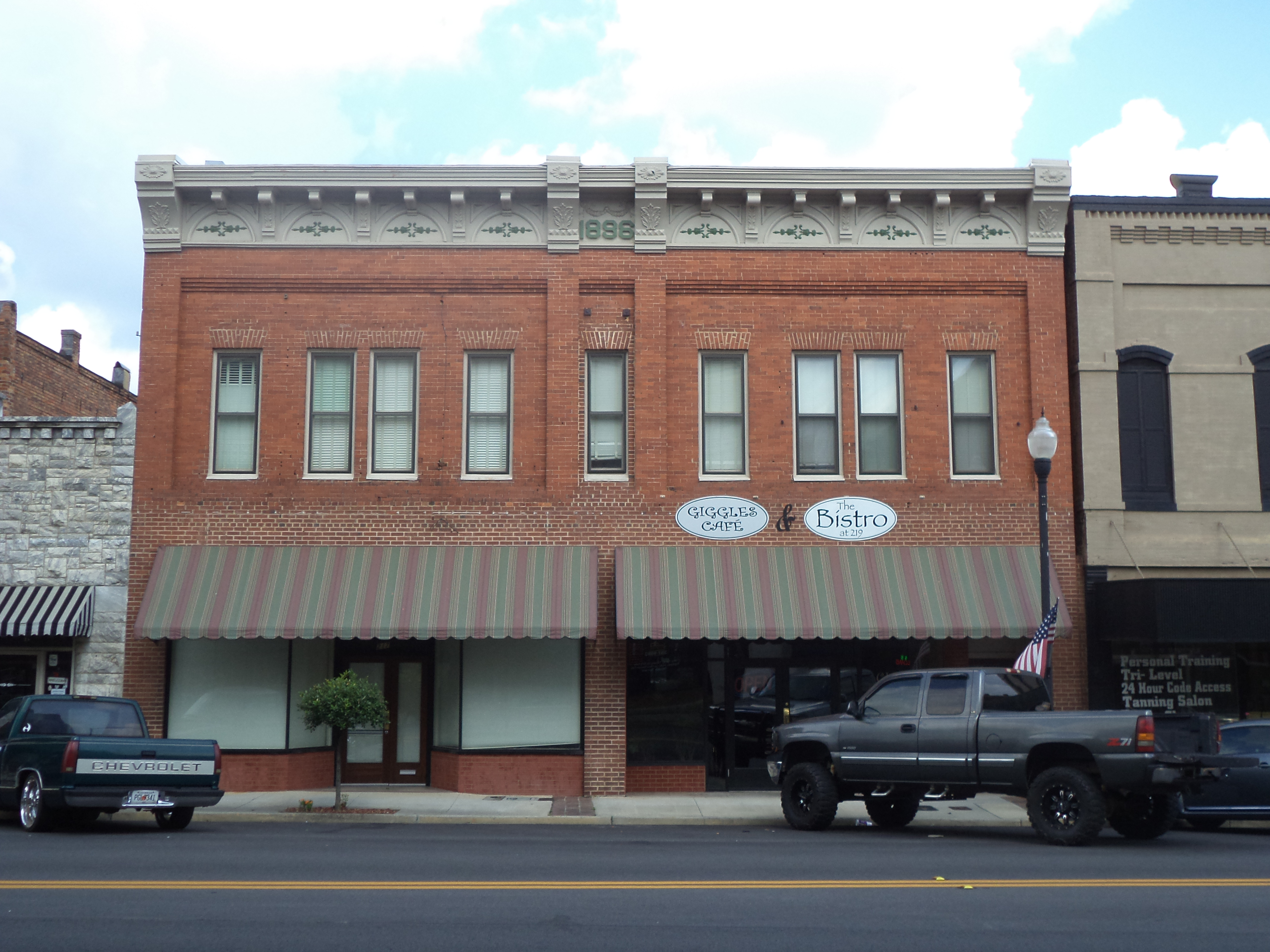
- 219 Main Street

- Location within Georgia Location within the United States
- Location: Roughly bounded by Second and Third Sts., Love, and Central Aves., (original); roughly bounded by Third St., Tift Ave., Ninth St. and Commerce Way, (increase) Tifton, Georgia
- Coordinates: 31°27′12″N 83°30′34″W
- Area: 35 acres (14 ha) (original), 15 acres (6.1 ha) (increase)
- Built: 1890-late 1930s
- Architect: Multiple
- Architectural style: Chicago, Late Victorian, The Commercial Style
- NRHP reference No.: 86000382 (original); 94000371 (increase)

Significant dates
- Added to NRHP: March 4, 1986 (original)
- Boundary increase: April 21, 1994 (increase)

Tifton Commercial Historic District, in Tifton in Tift County, Georgia, is a historic district that was listed on the National Register of Historic Places (NRHP) in 1986 and expanded in 1994. The original listing was portions of 10 blocks including buildings from the 1890s to the late 1930s, most built of brick.

Approximate area of the district

The original district was 35 acres (14 ha) in size and included two groups of building in areas on the north and south sides of east–west Atlantic Coast Line Railroad, to the east of the north–south Southern Railway line. It included 57 contributing buildings and one contributing structure.

Notable resources are:

- Tift County Courthouse (1912), Beaux Arts in style, designed by William A. Edwards, separately NRHP-listed in 1980
- Lockeby Building (1937), deemed "a fine local example" of Art Deco with "its cast-stone vertical banding"
- Tift Theatre (1937), Art Moderne, with a multi-colored Carrara glass facade
- Myon Hotel (1906), now the Tifton City Hall, "massive", with three stories, with Georgian Revival influence, designed by Montgomery, Alabama architect B.B. Smith
- former U.S. Post Office (1914), the town's library by 1985, Renaissance Revival, design credited to Oscar Wenderoth
- former Bank of Tifton (1917), a C&S Bank in 1985, "a fine example of the Neoclassical style", also designed by William A. Edwards
- former Union Station (1916), the Chamber of Commerce in 1985, in long, low Prairie-influenced style
- Twin Brick Warehouses (1922 and 1925), on former site of Tift's sawmill, at the east edge of the district, landmarks "by virtue of their immense size (approximately 100 by 400 feet (30 m × 122 m) each) and their easily recognizable stepped-parapet fronts"

Three buildings had received Preliminary Certifications of Significance from the National Register Programs Division of the National Park Service Southeast Regional Office:

- 214 East Second Street (December 6, 1983);
- the Lockeby Building, corner of Third and Main (February 27, 1985), and
- Myon Hotel (February 27, 1985).

The amendment in 1994 expanded the district by 15 acres (6.1 ha) to include four blocks of mostly one- and two-story commercial buildings, including warehouses. It added 28 contributing buildings. The Masonic Lodge building in this area is the only three-story building in the increase.

The amendment in 1994 also recognized contributing building status for the Bowen Building, an Art Deco building built c. 1900 but renovated extensively in 1937 after a fire, which is located at the southwest corner of Third Street and South Main Street. In 1994, the corner tenant in the building was a drug store, and the other portion was a Christian bookstore.

== Photos ==
Buildings near 2nd St. and Love Ave.

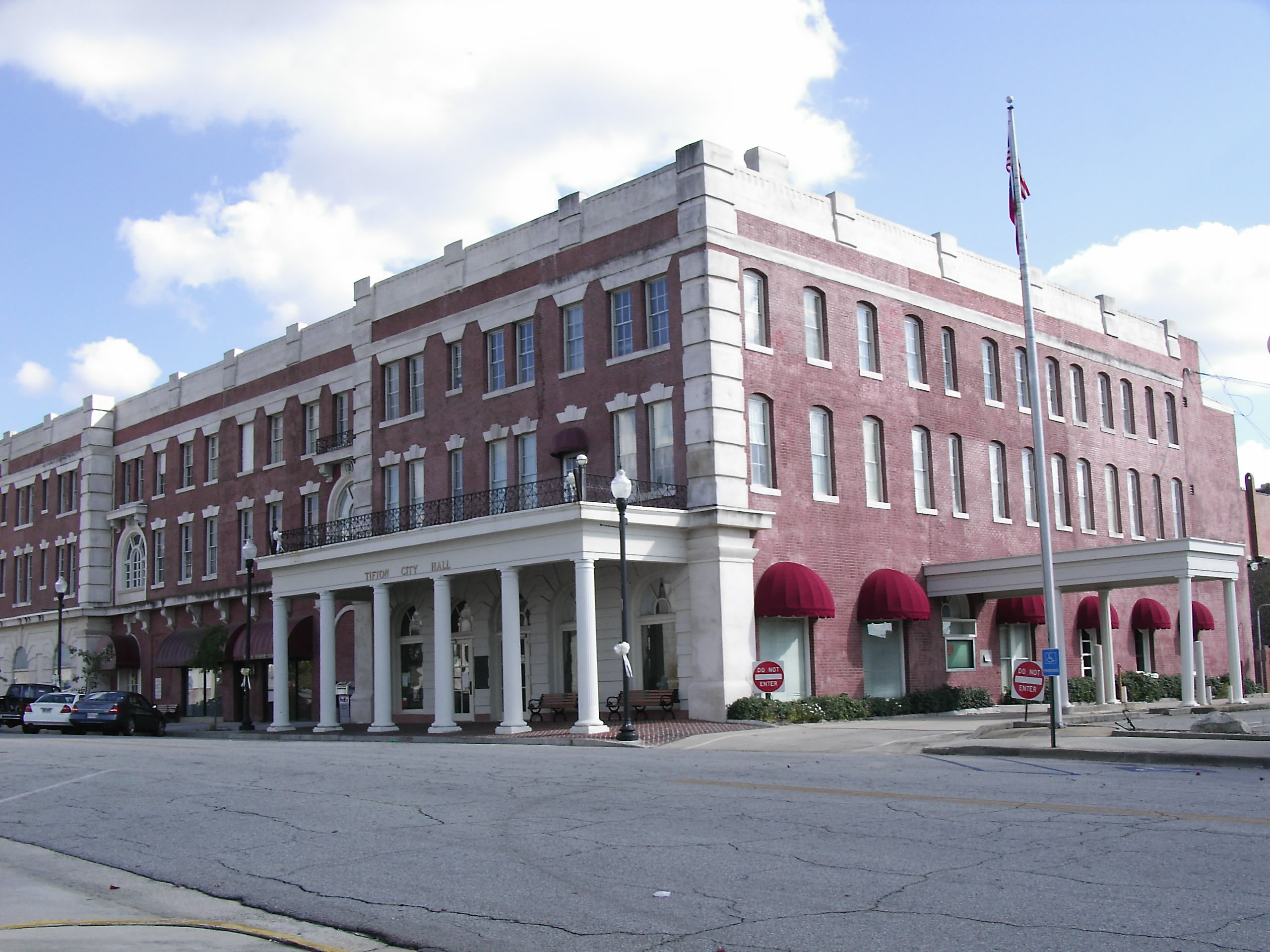
Myon Hotel (current City Hall)

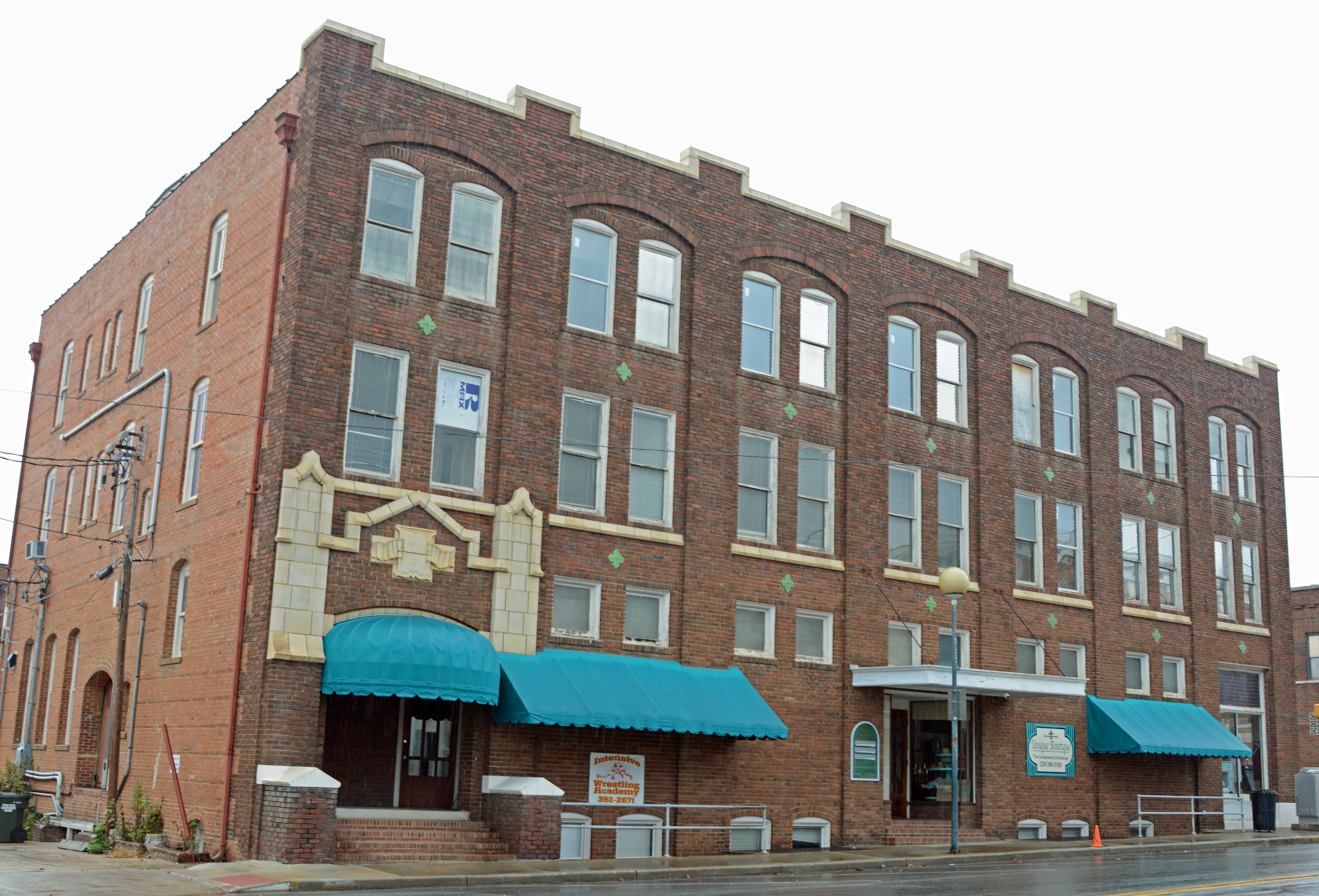
Masonic Lodge

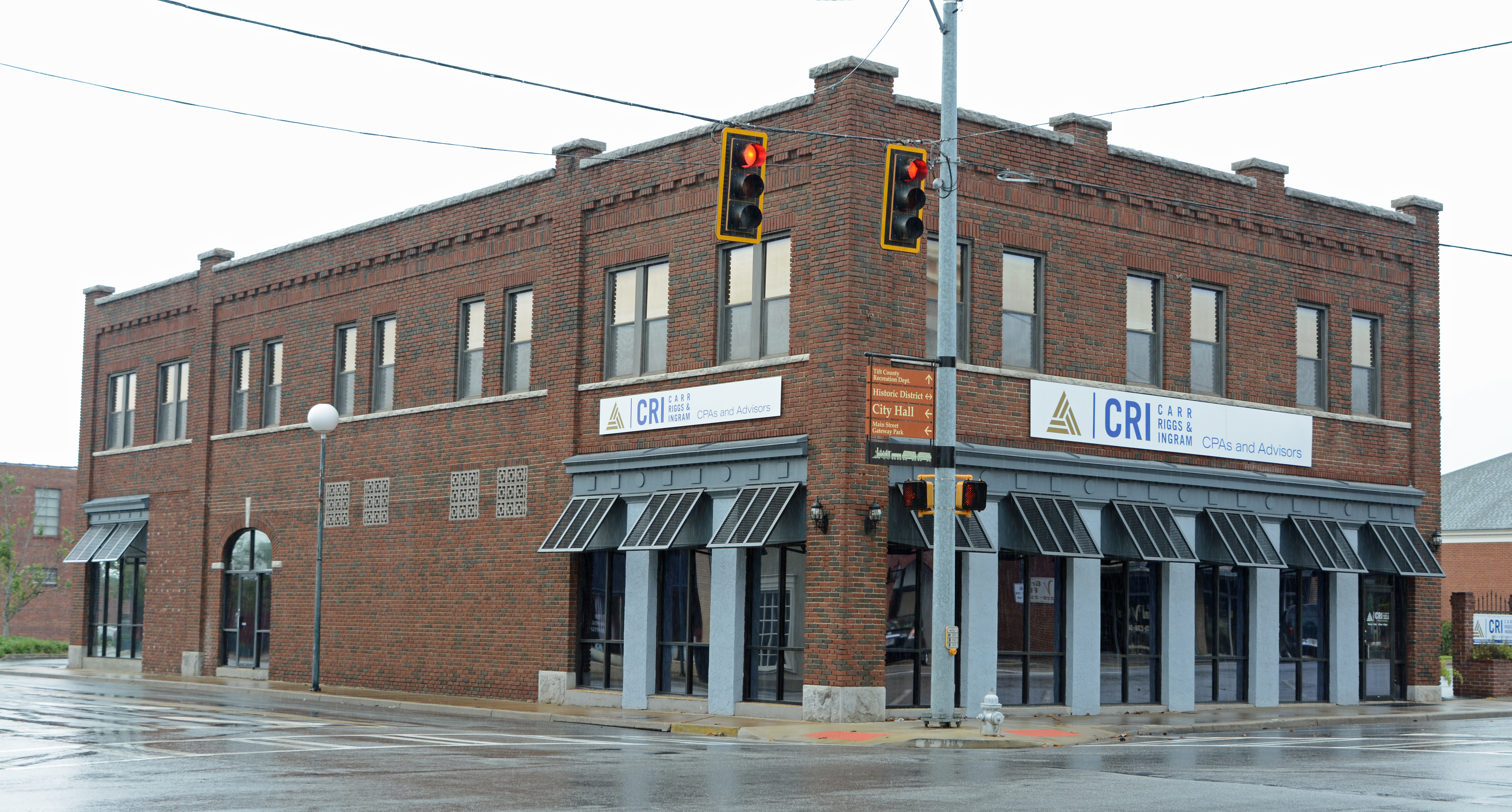

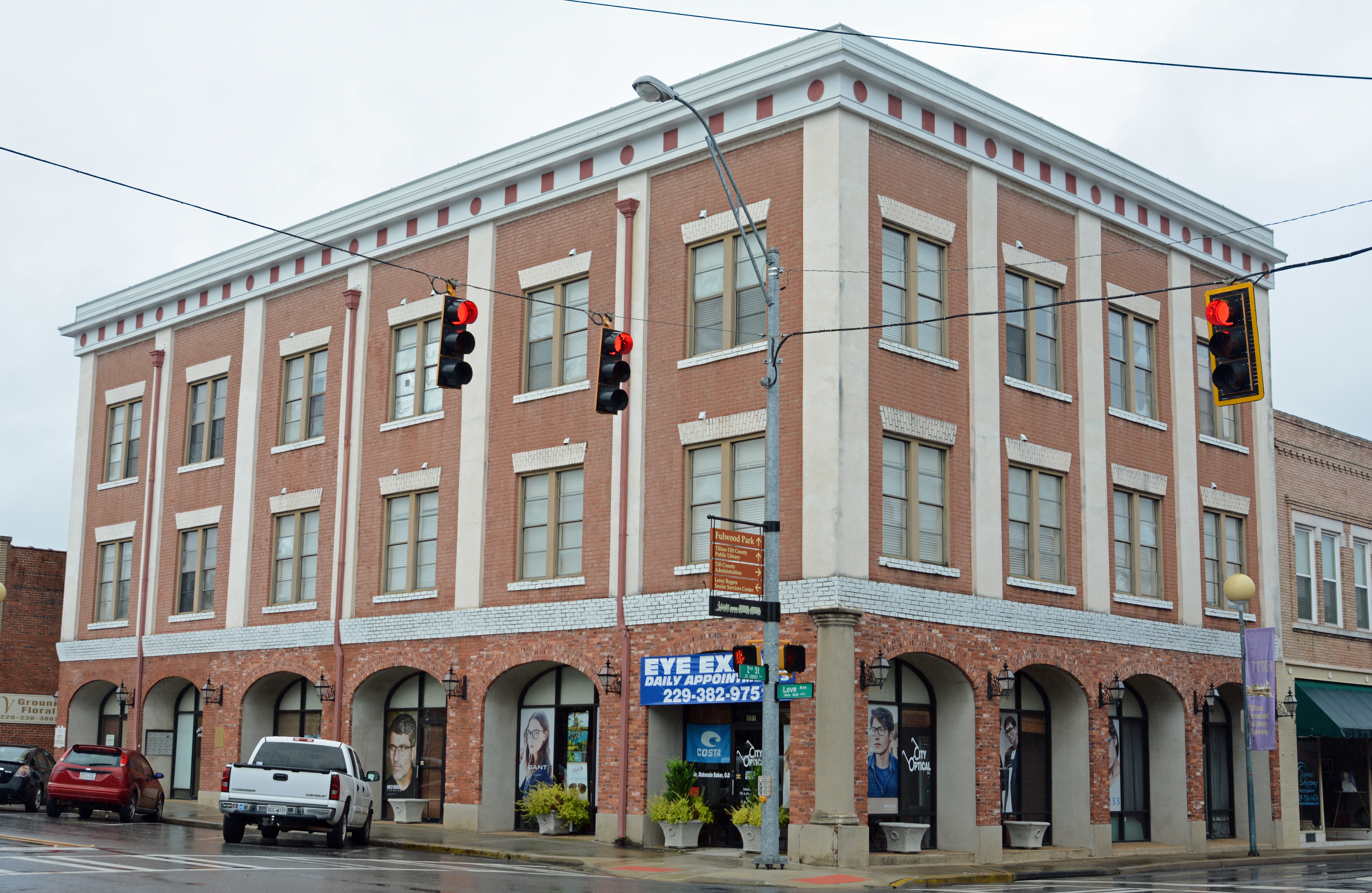

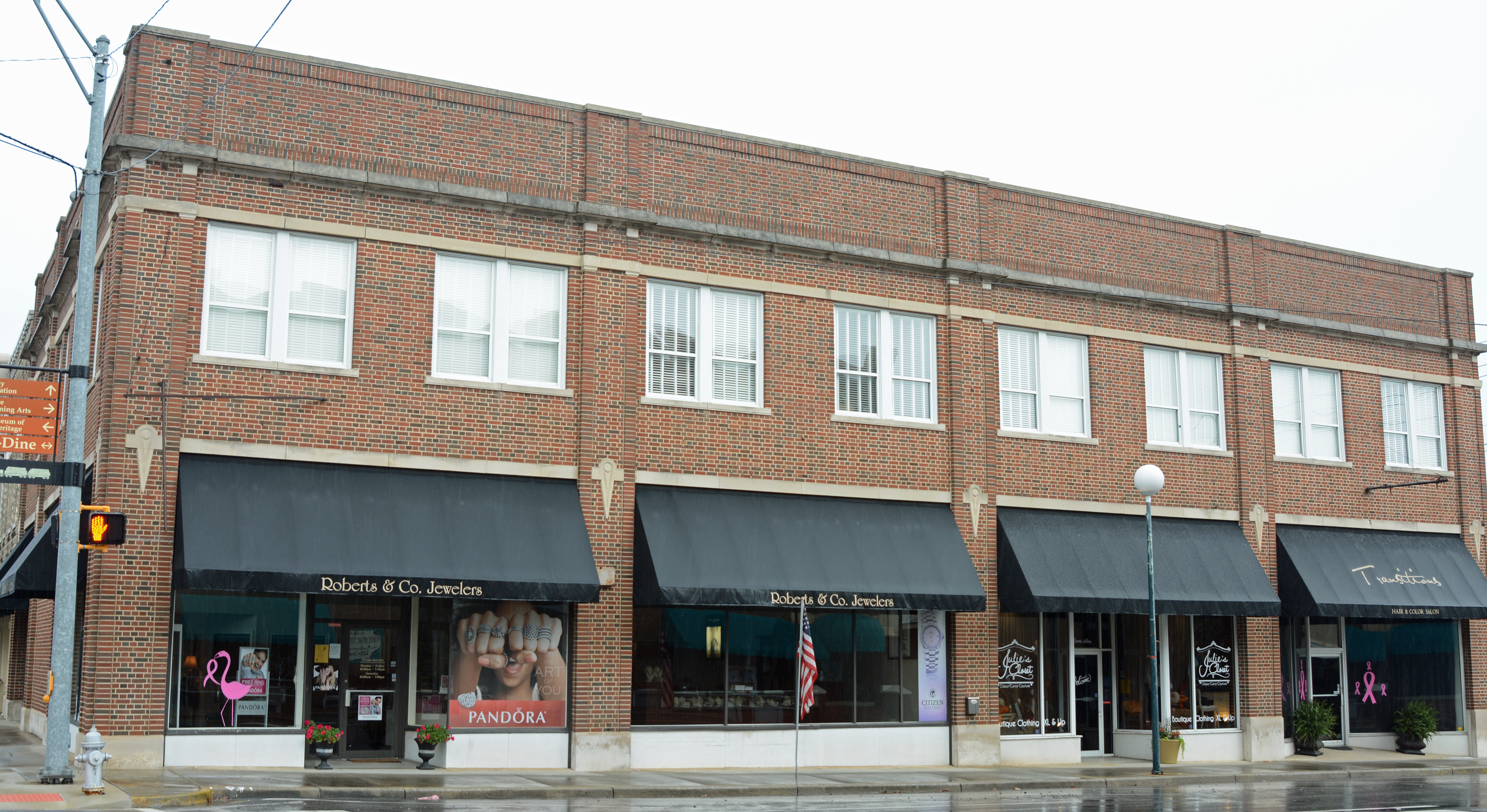

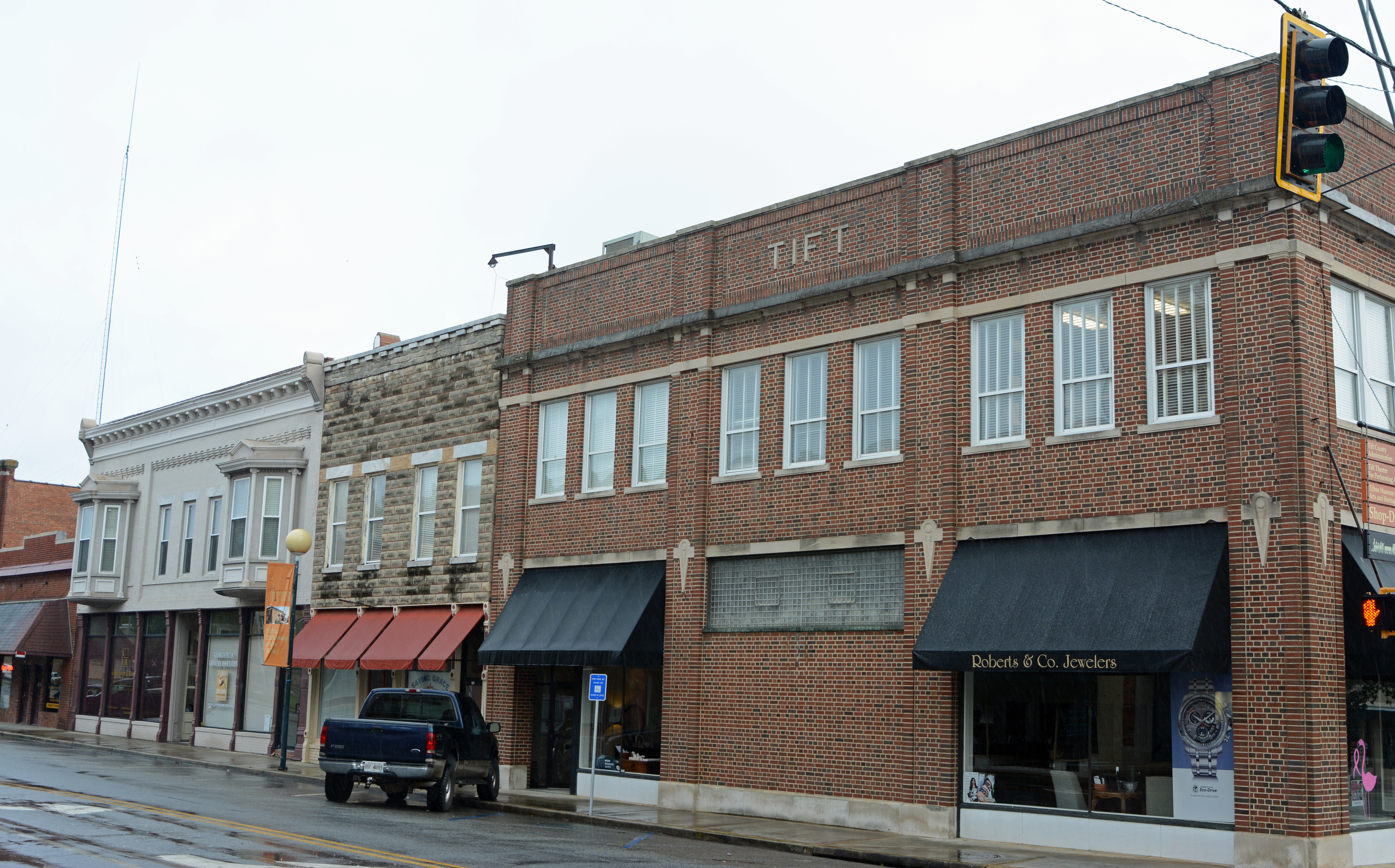

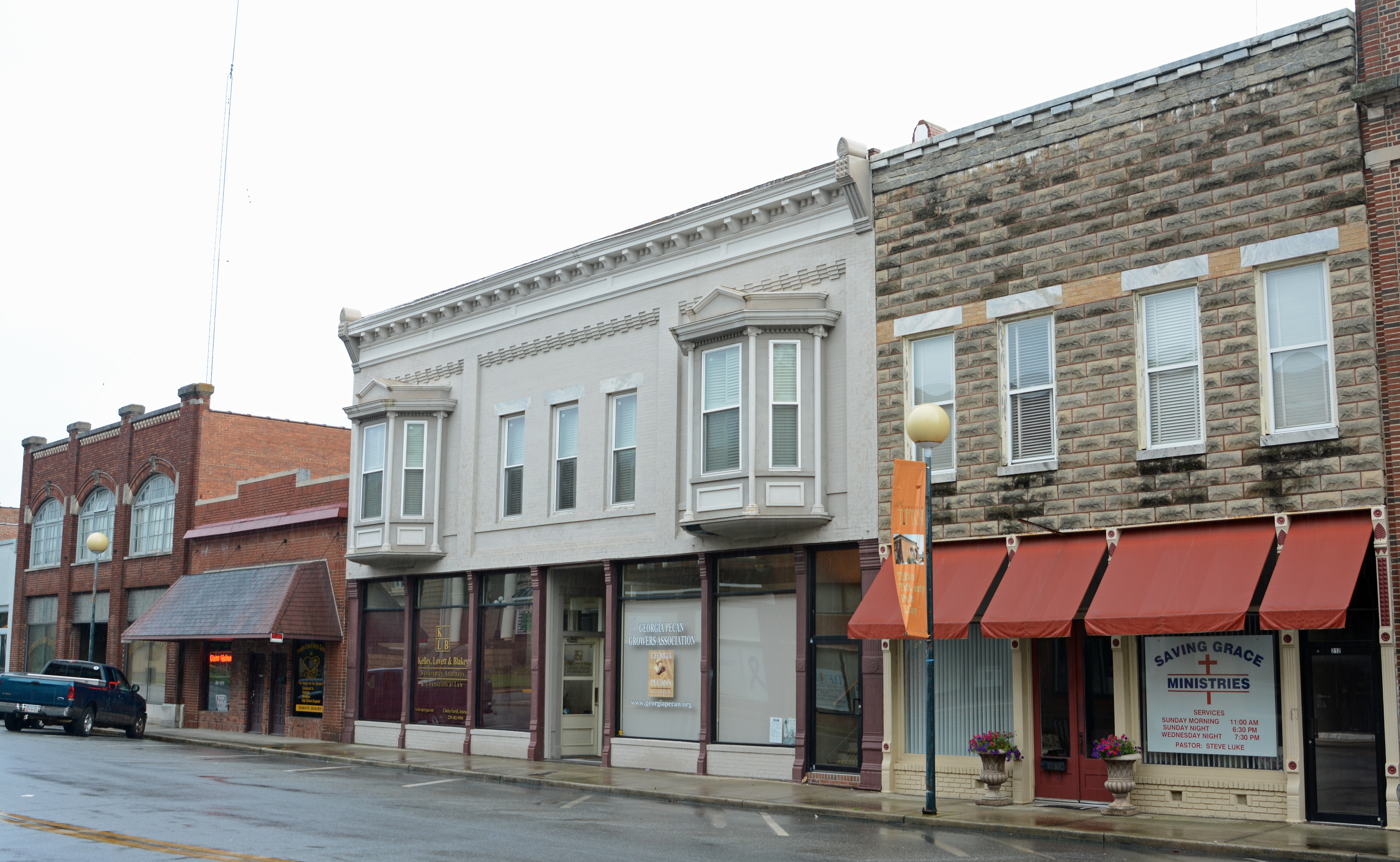

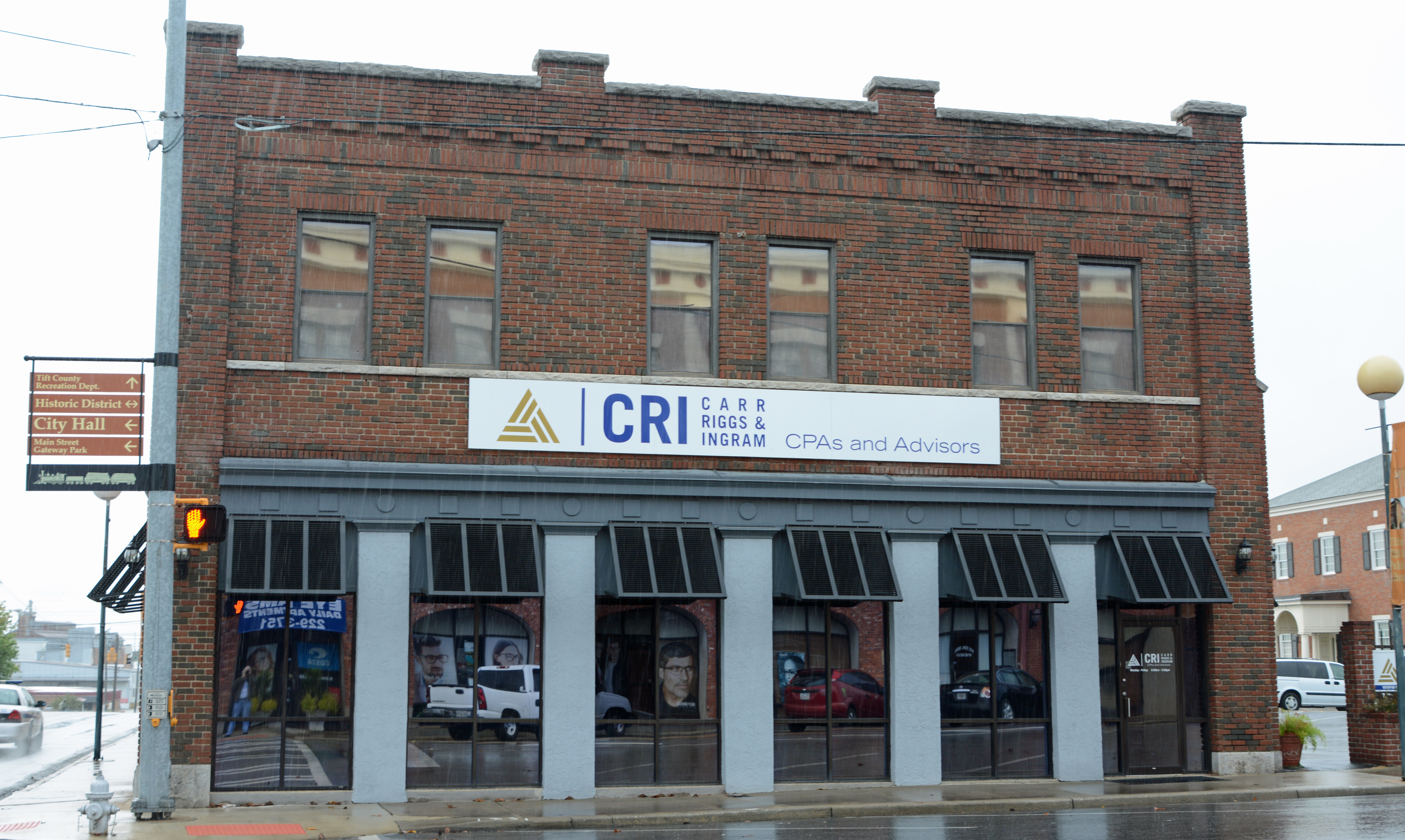

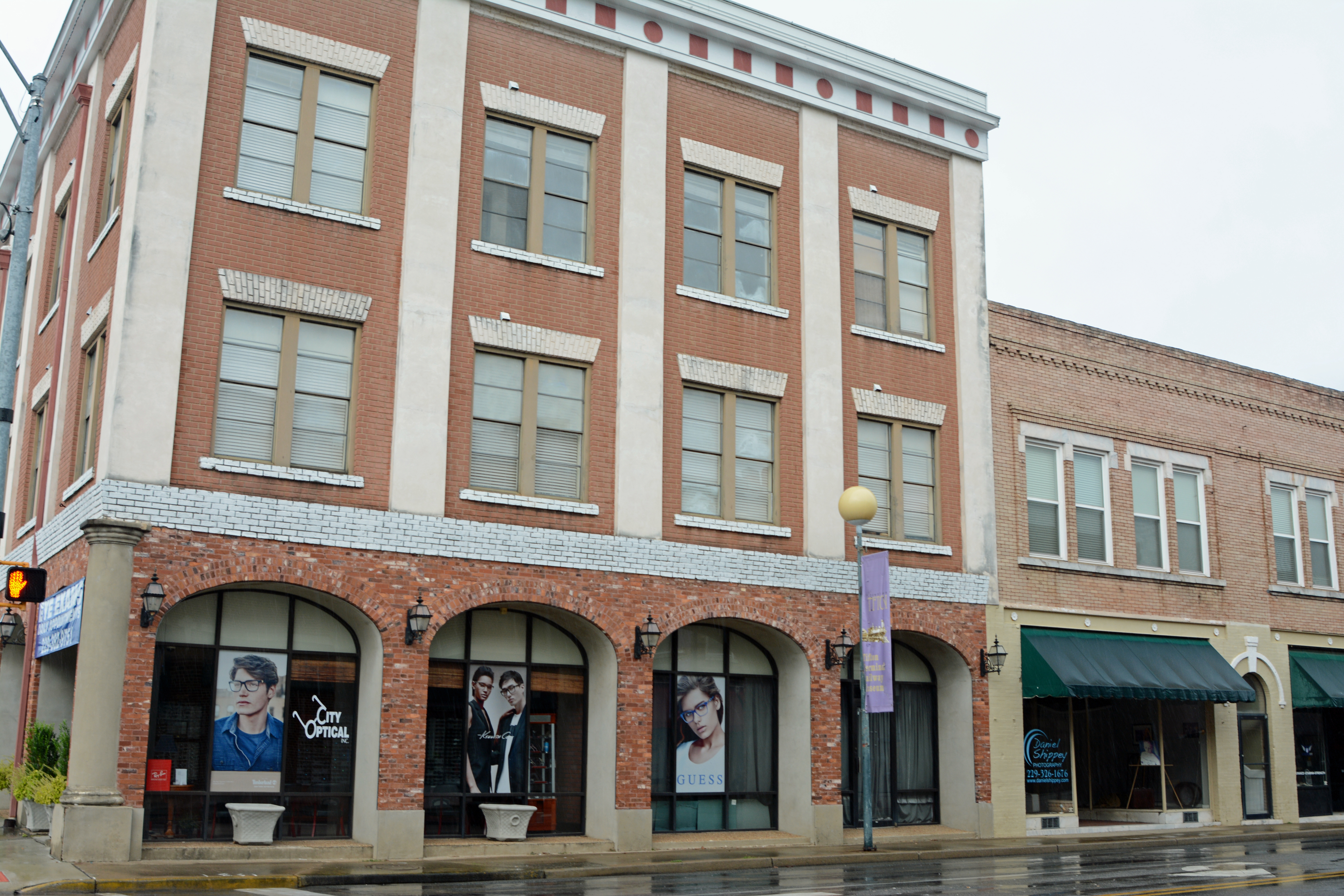

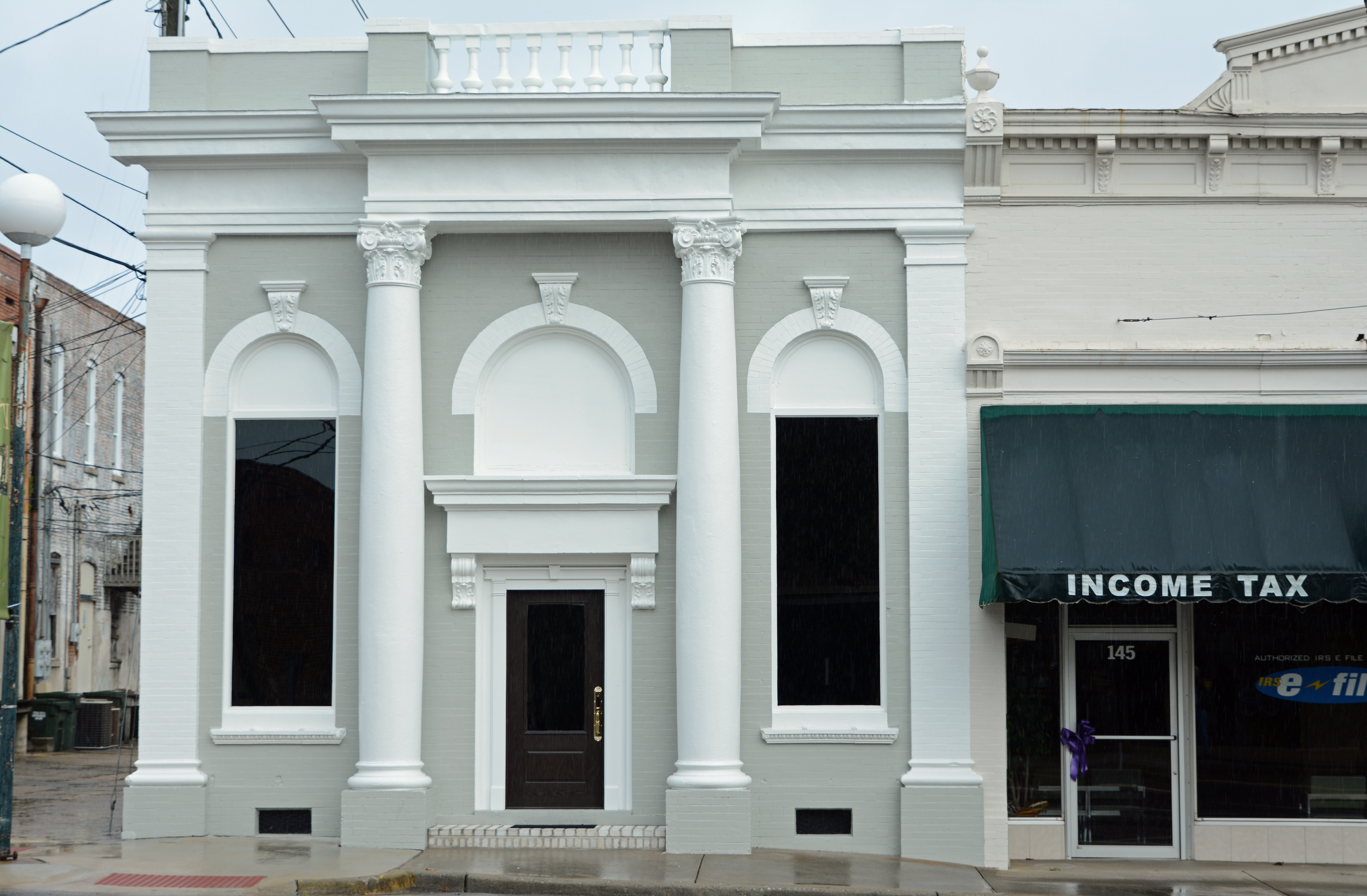

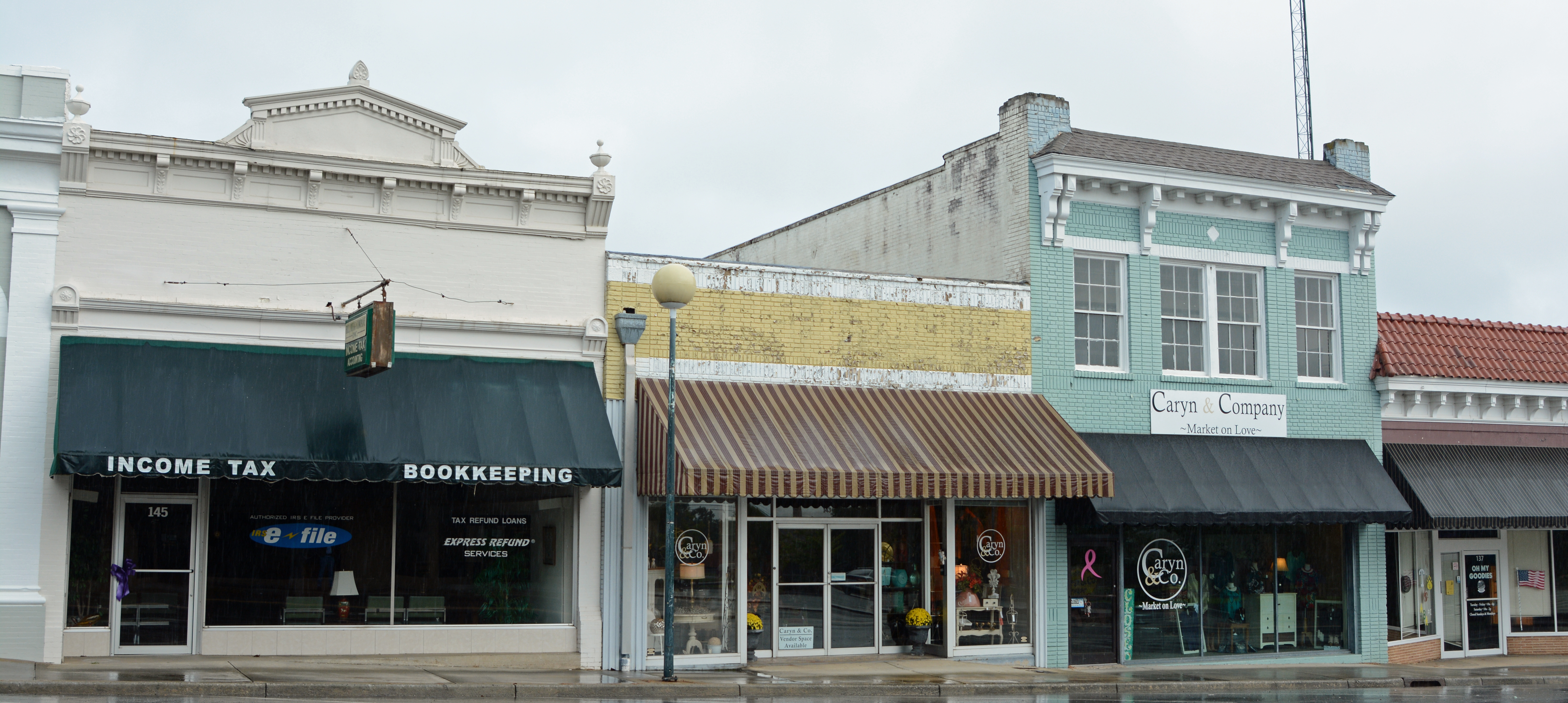

== merging stuff ==
SHOULD ADD NEWER REFNUM and ADDRESS and perhaps more TO NRHP listings page for the county, which has/shows: |address=Roughly Bounded by 14th, Goff, 2nd Sts and Forrest Ave. |city=Tifton |county=Tift County, Georgia |date=2008-04-30 |lat=31.459633 |lon=-83.507

ADD WHAT ELELMENTS IN Tifton Commercial Historic District (original) had architecture = Chicago, Late Victorian, The Commercial Style.

== See also ==
- Tifton Residential Historic District
