= National Register of Historic Places listings in Tift County, Georgia =

This is a list of properties and districts in Tift County, Georgia that are listed on the National Register of Historic Places (NRHP).

This National Park Service list is complete through NPS recent listings posted March 21, 2025.

== Current listings ==
	Name on the Register	Image	Date listed	Location	City or town	Description
1	Tift County Courthouse	Tift County Courthouse	September 18, 1980 (#80001245)	Courthouse Sq. 31°27′16″N 83°30′29″W	Tifton	Included in the Tifton Commercial Historic District
2	Tifton Commercial Historic District	Tifton Commercial Historic District	March 4, 1986 (#86000382)	Roughly bounded by Second and Third Sts., Love, and Central Aves. (original); Roughly bounded by Third St., Tift Ave., Ninth St. and Commerce Way (increase); 31°27′12″N 83°30′34″W	Tifton	Boundary increase in 1994.
3	Tifton Residential Historic District	Tifton Residential Historic District	April 30, 2008 (#08000355)	Roughly Bounded by 14th, Goff, 2nd Sts and Forrest Ave. 31°27′35″N 83°30′25″W	Tifton	
