= Tifton Residential Historic District =

Historic district in Tifton, Georgia

- U.S. National Register of Historic Places
- U.S. Historic district
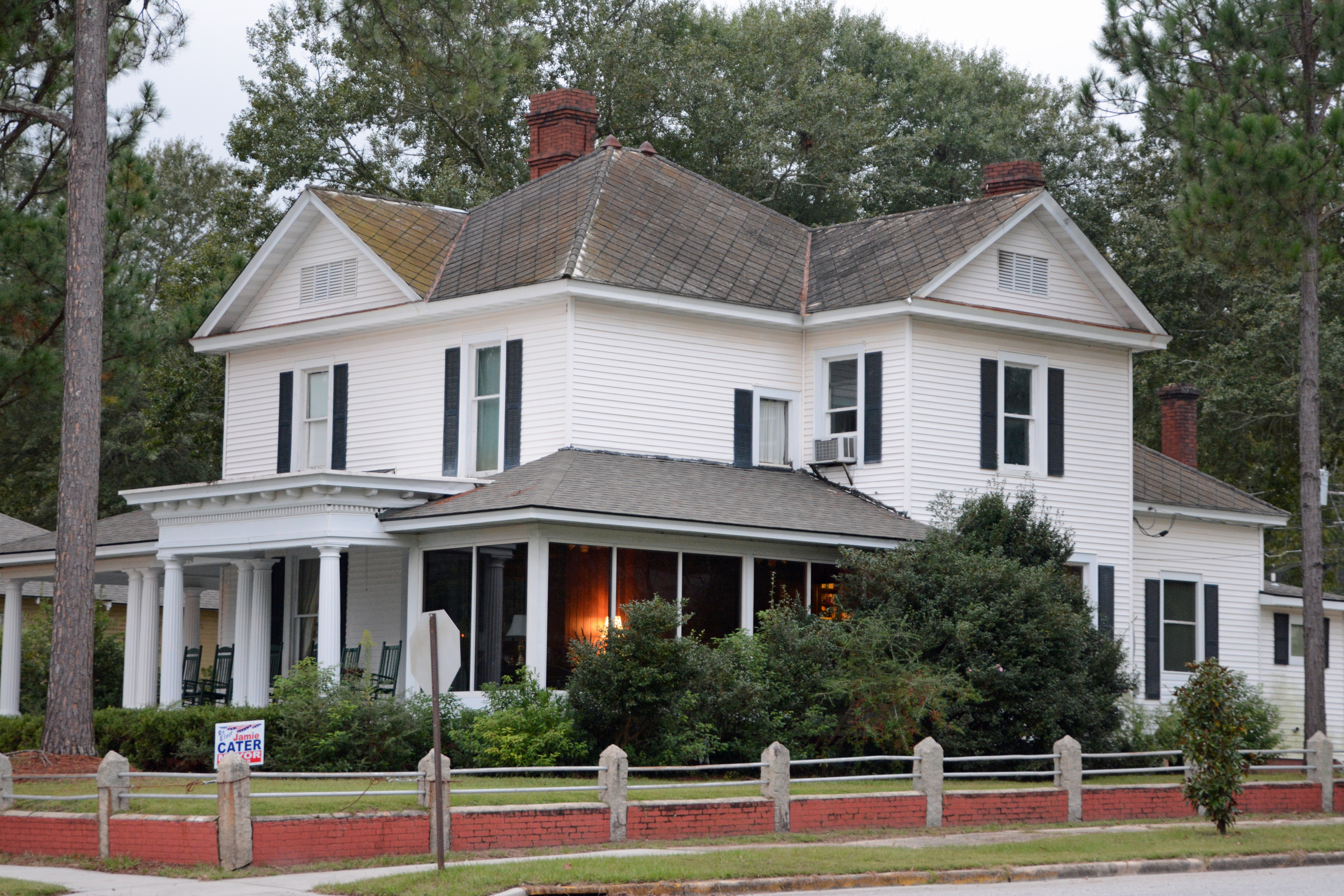
- 424 Park Ave.

- Location within Georgia
- Location: Roughly Bounded by 14th, Goff, & 2nd Sts.& Forrest Ave., Tifton, Georgia
- Area: 614 acres (248 ha)
- Built: 1888
- Architect: Columbus W. Fulwood, Jr. T. Firth Lockwood, Jr., Pringle & Smith
- Architectural style: Queen Anne, Late 19th and 20th Century Revivals, Folk Victorian
- NRHP reference No.: 08000355
- Added to NRHP: April 30, 2008

The Tifton Residential Historic District, in Tifton, Georgia, is a historic district which was listed on the National Register of Historic Places in 2008.

== History and description ==
The majority of the district is residential. The site is roughly bounded by 14th St., Goff, & 2nd Sts. & Forrest Ave. Gas stations, boarding houses, motels, and restaurants were built in the district from the mid-1920s through the 1950s to serve U.S. Highway 41, (Note: U.S. 41 runs east-west on 12th Street and north-south on Love Ave.) which was – and still is – a major tourism route between Georgia and Florida.

The district was deemed historically significant because it is a "good example of a historic white residential area" from the 20th century. It also contains "an excellent collection" of Queen Anne and Craftsman architectural styles.

== Structures ==
The listing includes 624 contributing buildings, a contributing structure, a contributing site, and two contributing objects on 614 acres (2.48 km^{2}).

Significant structures on the property include:

- the former Pope House-Lankford Manor (1892), 401 Love Avenue, in recent years the Three Graces Manor bed and breakfast. Built as a single-family house, it was converted into a boarding house and restaurant in 1934, with enclosure of its two-story porch. Includes Queen Anne-stylistic elements including use of pedimented gables and decorative wood shingles.
- Tifton Coca-Cola Bottling Plant (1937), Beaux-Arts in style, designed by architects Pringle and Smith
- Tifton Telephone Exchange Building (1917–24)
- former Tifton City Hall (1950), 127 Central Avenue North
- the former Tifton High School (c.1917) and its gymnasium and vocational building, 225 Tift Avenue North.
- 1906 First Baptist Church (1906), at 404 Love Avenue, a brick, Romanesque Revival-style church, with an arcaded entrance, round-arched stained-glass windows, and two square corner towers. Designed by architect T. Firth Lockwood, Jr. (1894–1963). (Or, more likely, by T. Firth Lockwood, Sr. (1868–1920))
- First Baptist Church (1961), also at 404 Love Avenue, stone and brick veneered, with a large rose window.
- First Presbyterian Church (1911), 217 N. Park Avenue, brick Gothic Revival.-style church with overhanging eaves, exposed rafters, stained glass, pointed-arch doors and windows, and brick buttresses.
- Tifton Primitive Baptist Church (1917), 401 Tift Avenue North, designed by Tifton architect C.W. Fulwood, Jr.; brick Gothic Revival.
- First United Methodist Church (1952), at E. 12th Street and Central Avenue, brick, Colonial Revival, with "a pedimented portico with modillions and full height Doric columns."
- Fulwood Park, a 42 acres (17 ha) city park, including a stone arched entrance (1934) erected by the Tifton Garden Club in honor of former mayor Columbus W. Fulwood, Sr. (with entrance designed by Columbus W. Fulwood, Jr.).
Gallery
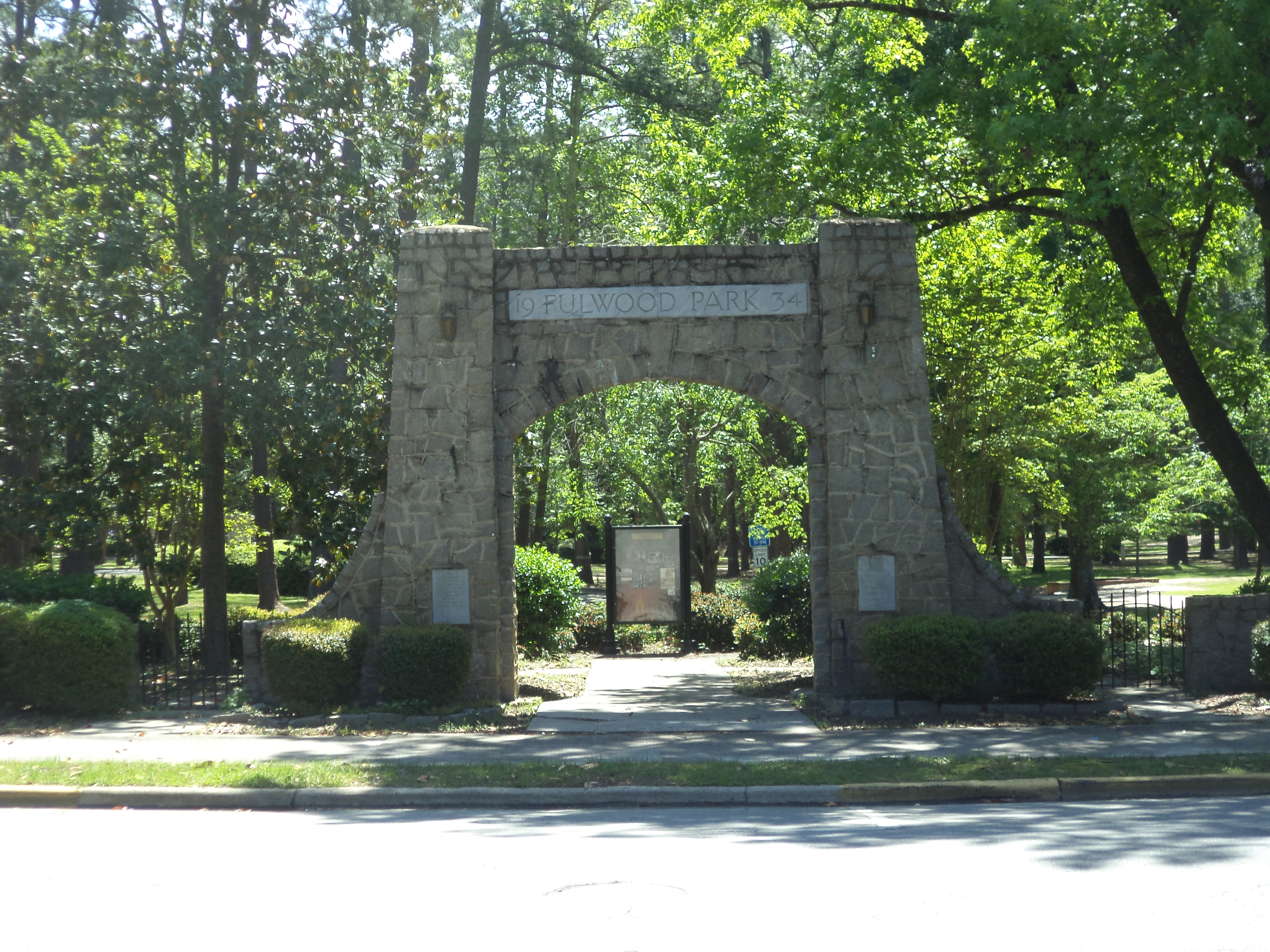
Stone entrance arch (1934), Fulwood Park (1917)

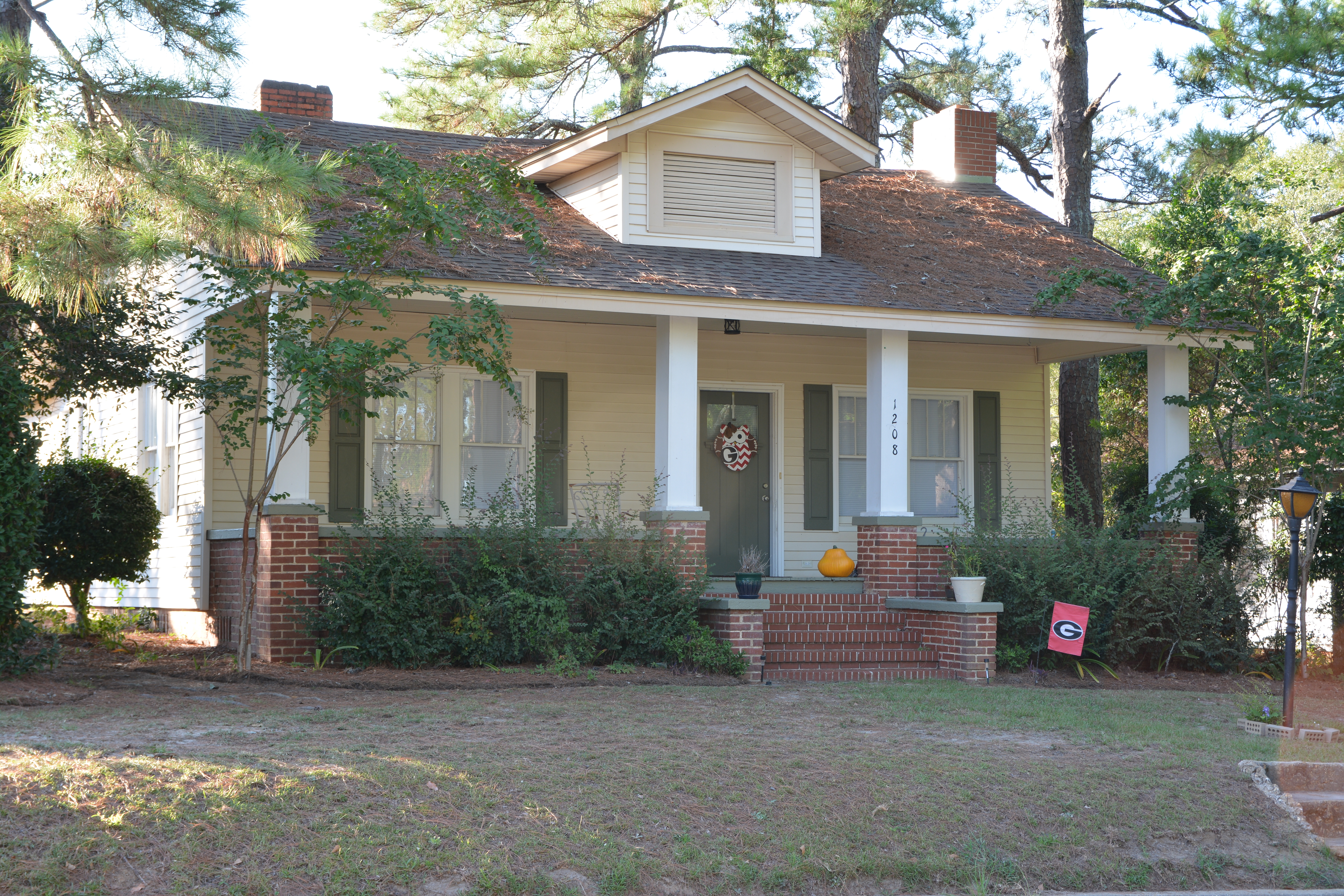
House at 1208 Love Ave

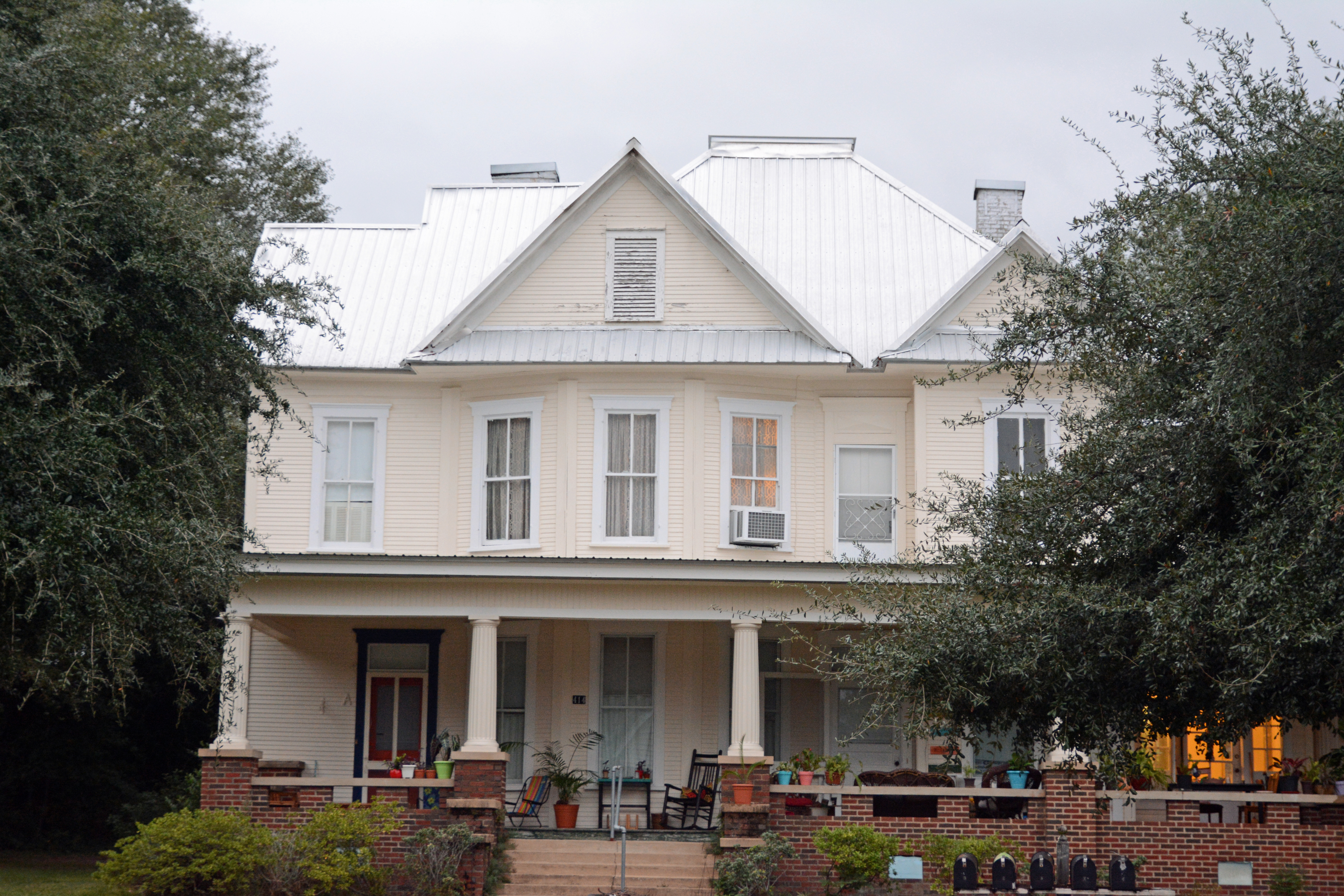
House at 414 Park Ave

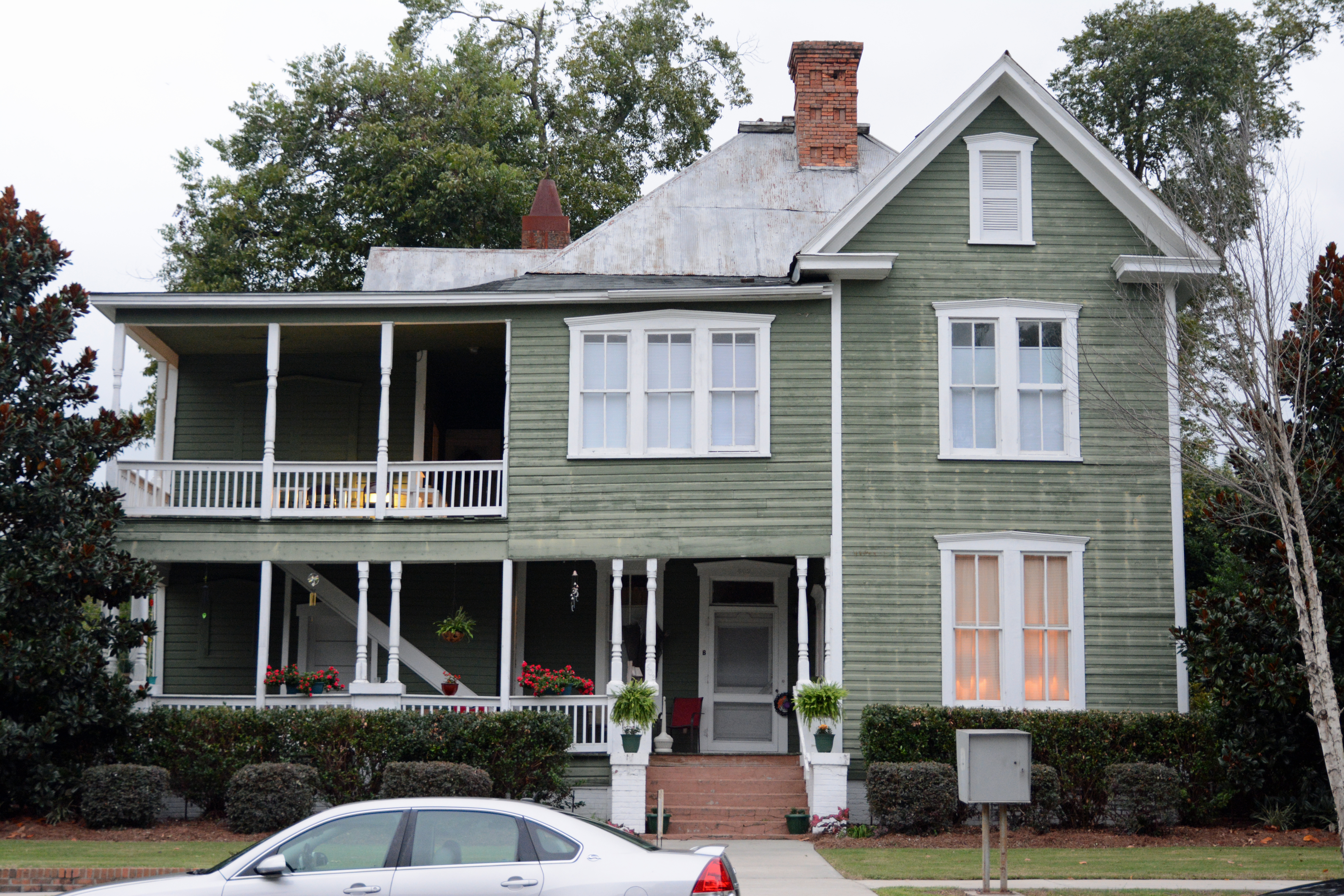
House at 602 Park Ave

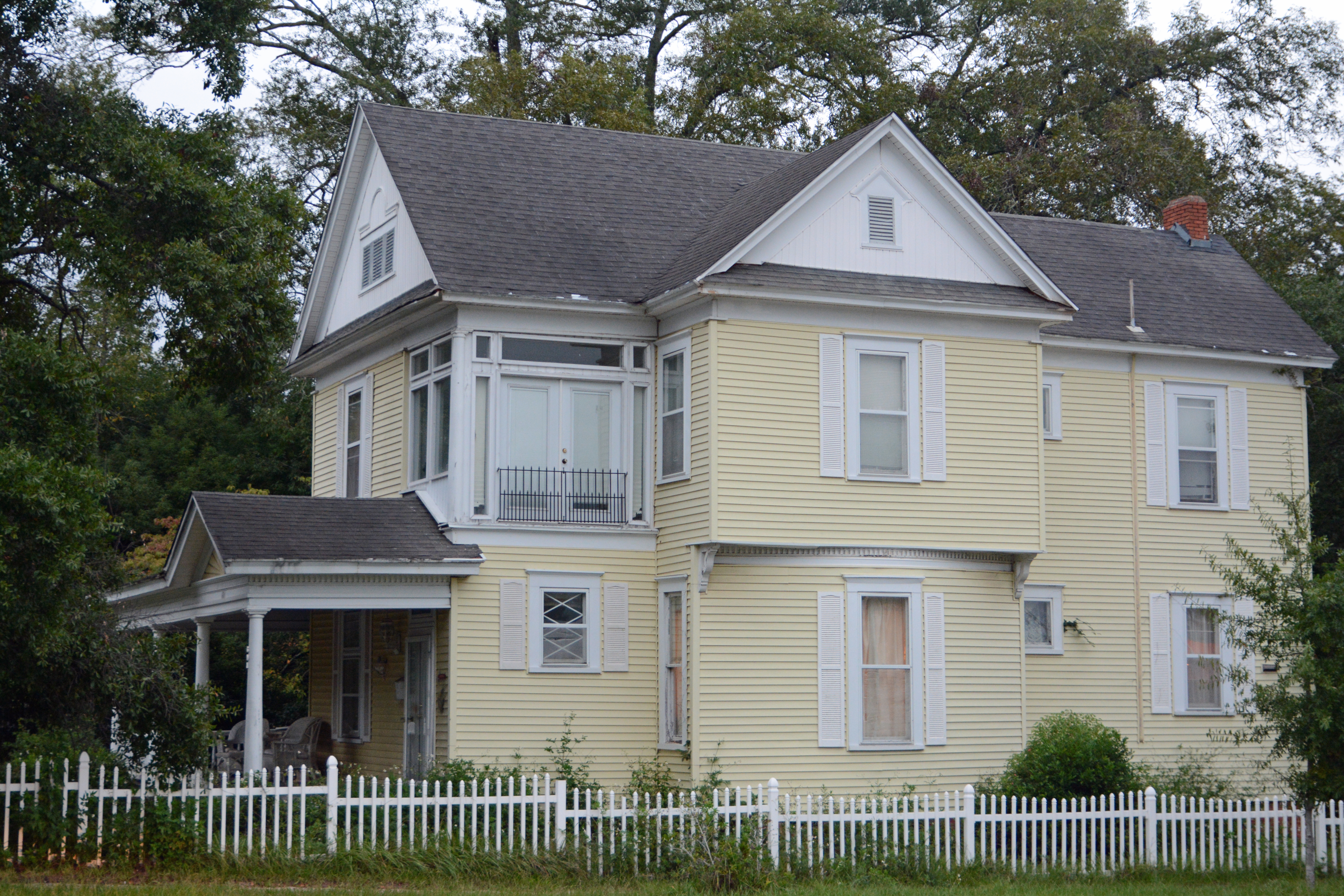
House at 601 Park Ave

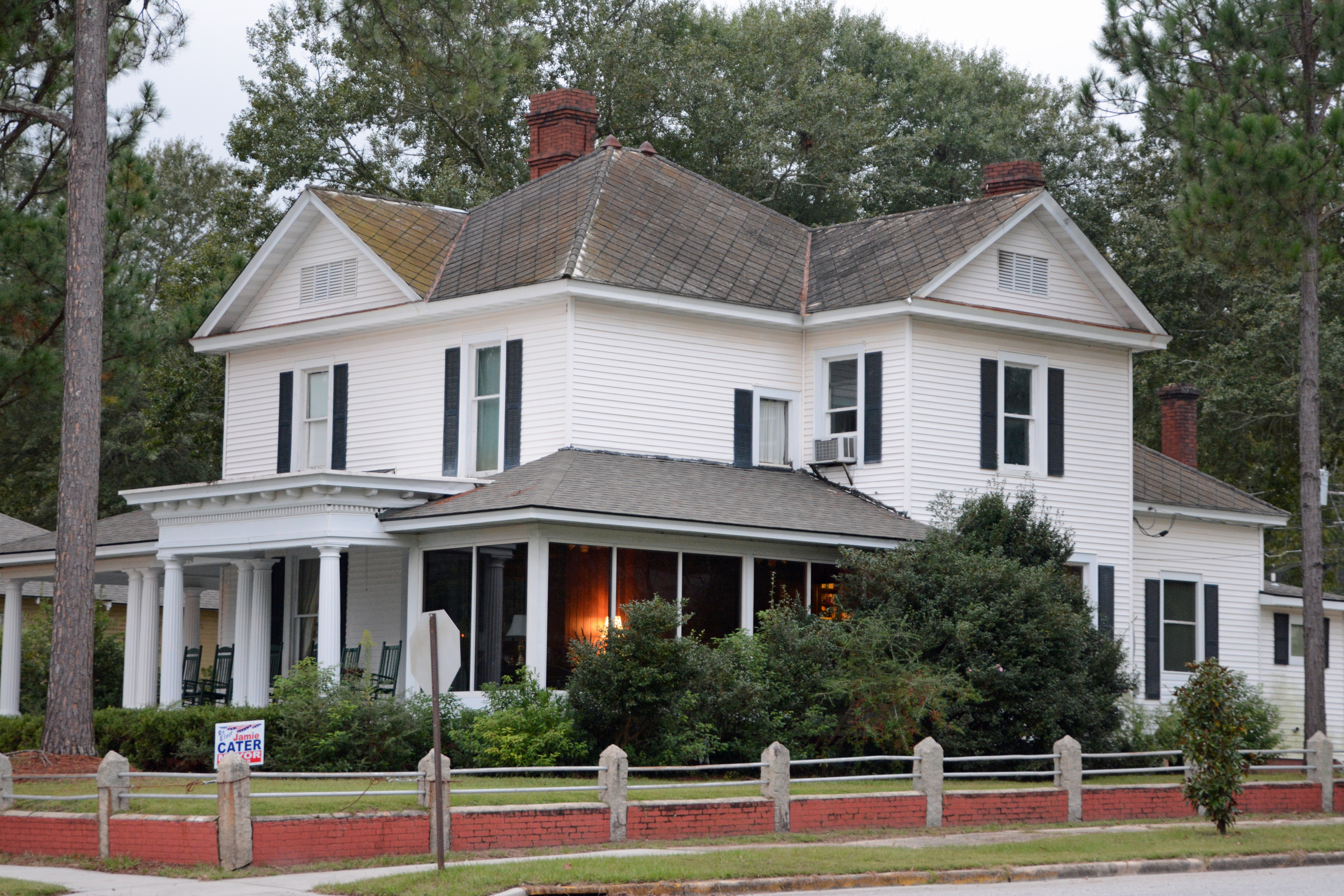
House at 424 Park Ave

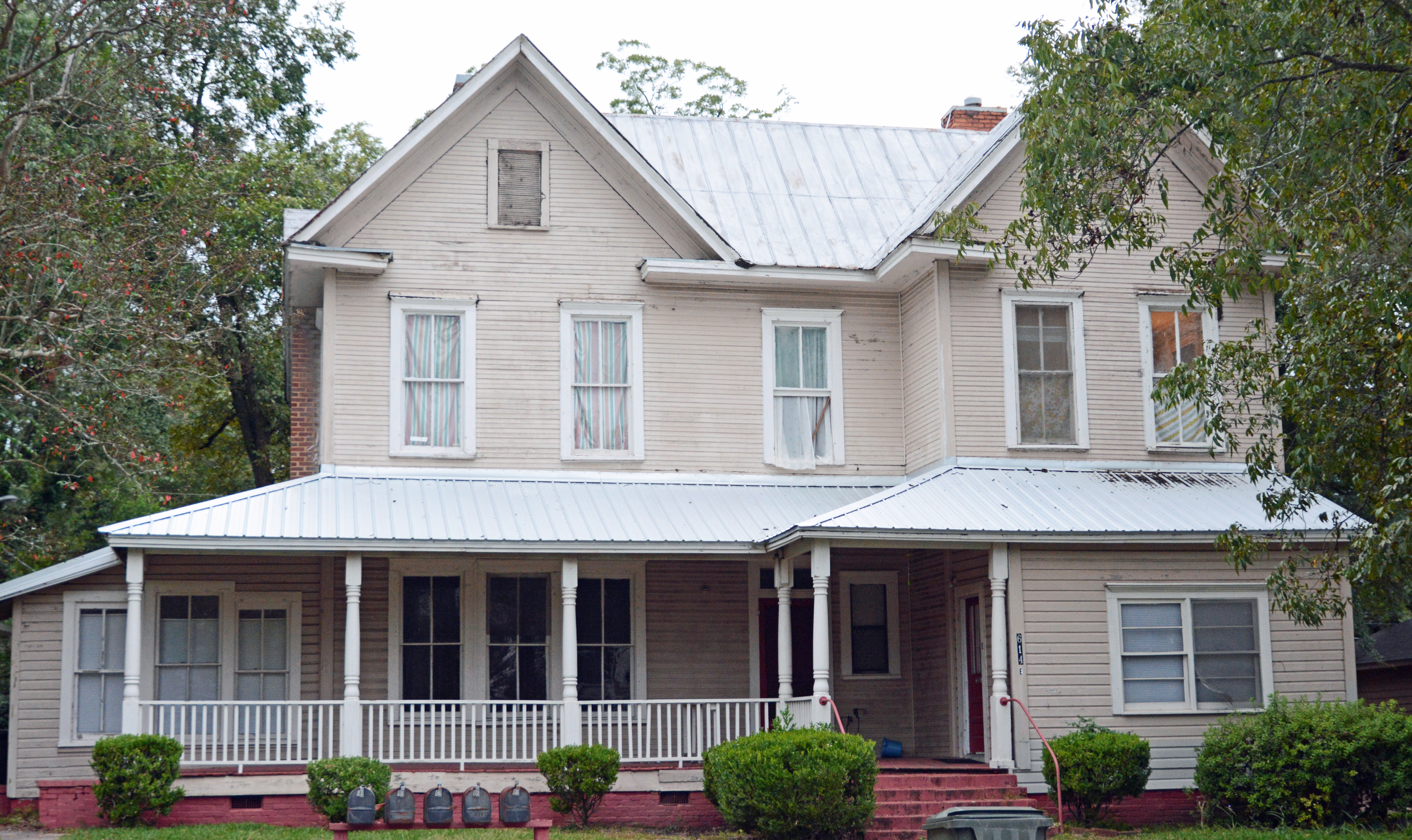
House at 614 Park Ave

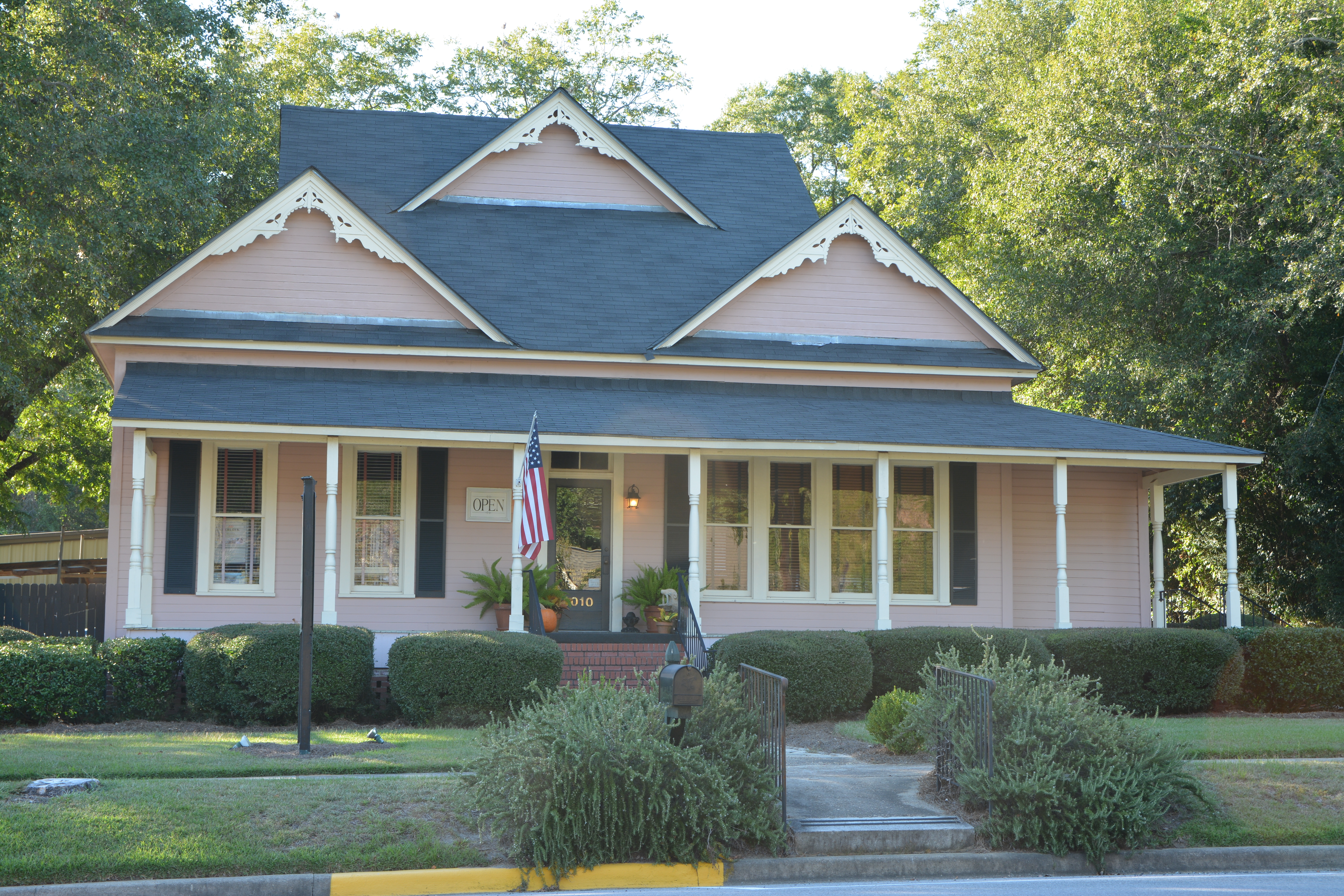
House at 1010 Love Ave (now a business)

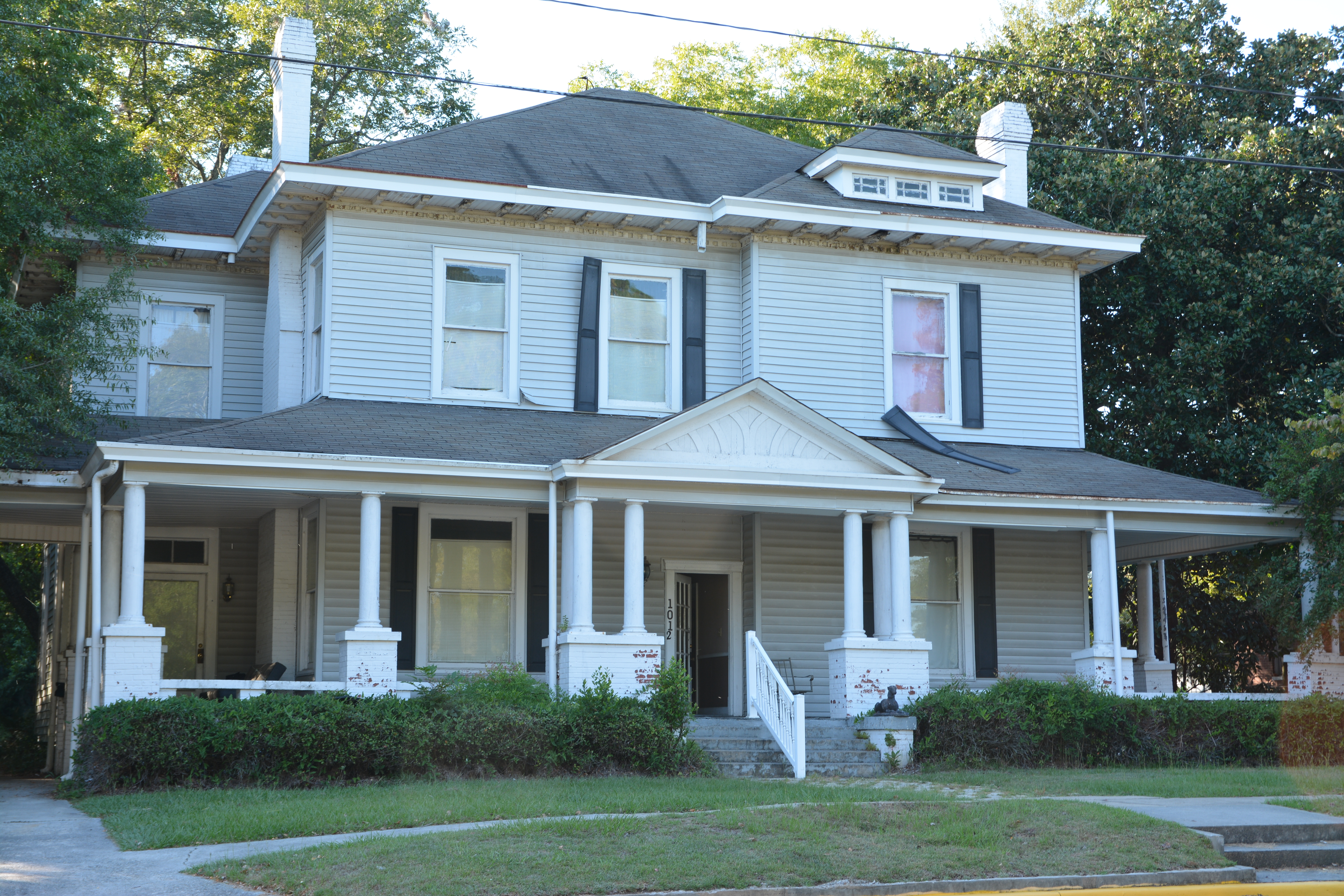
House at 1012 Love Ave

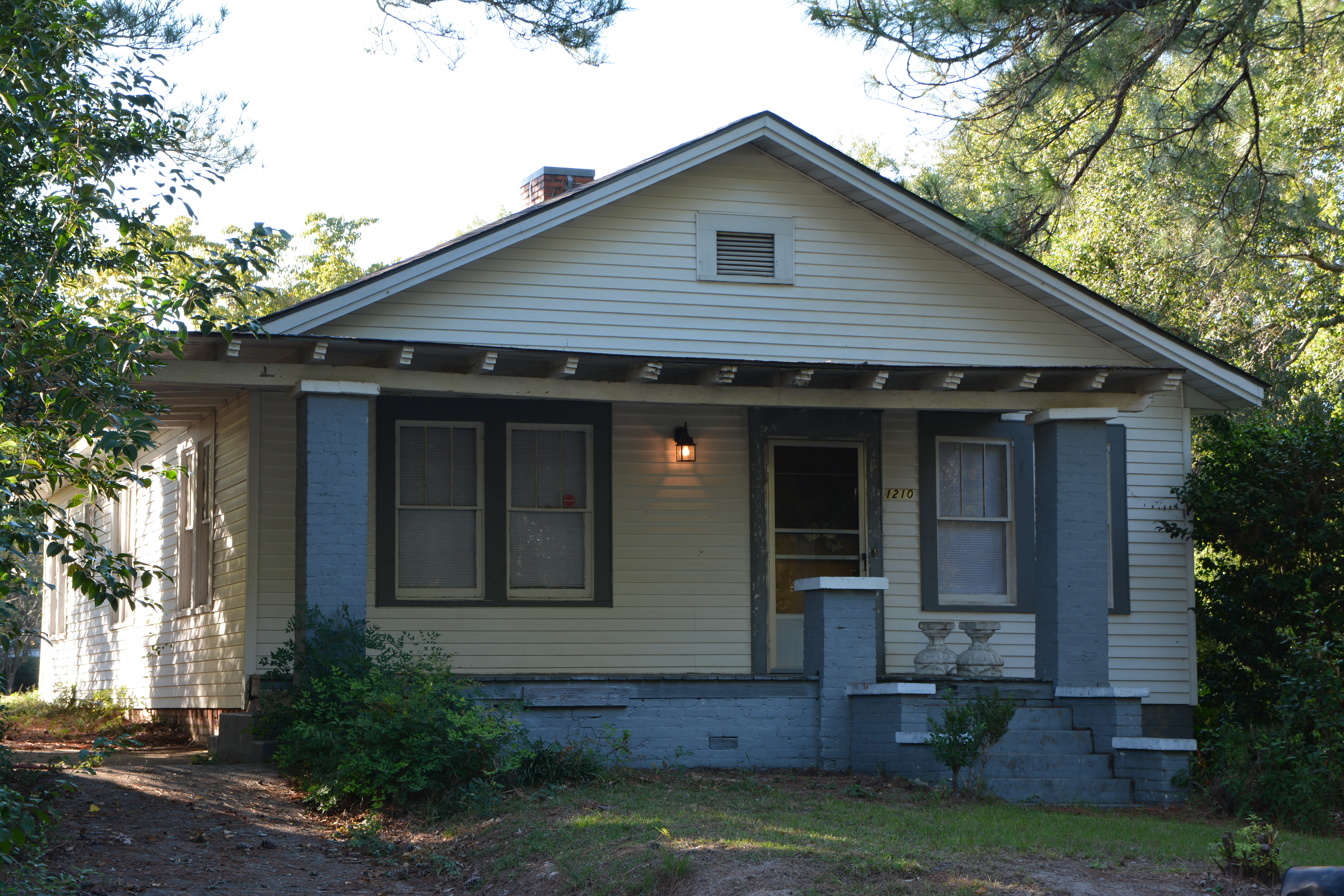
House at 1210 Love Ave

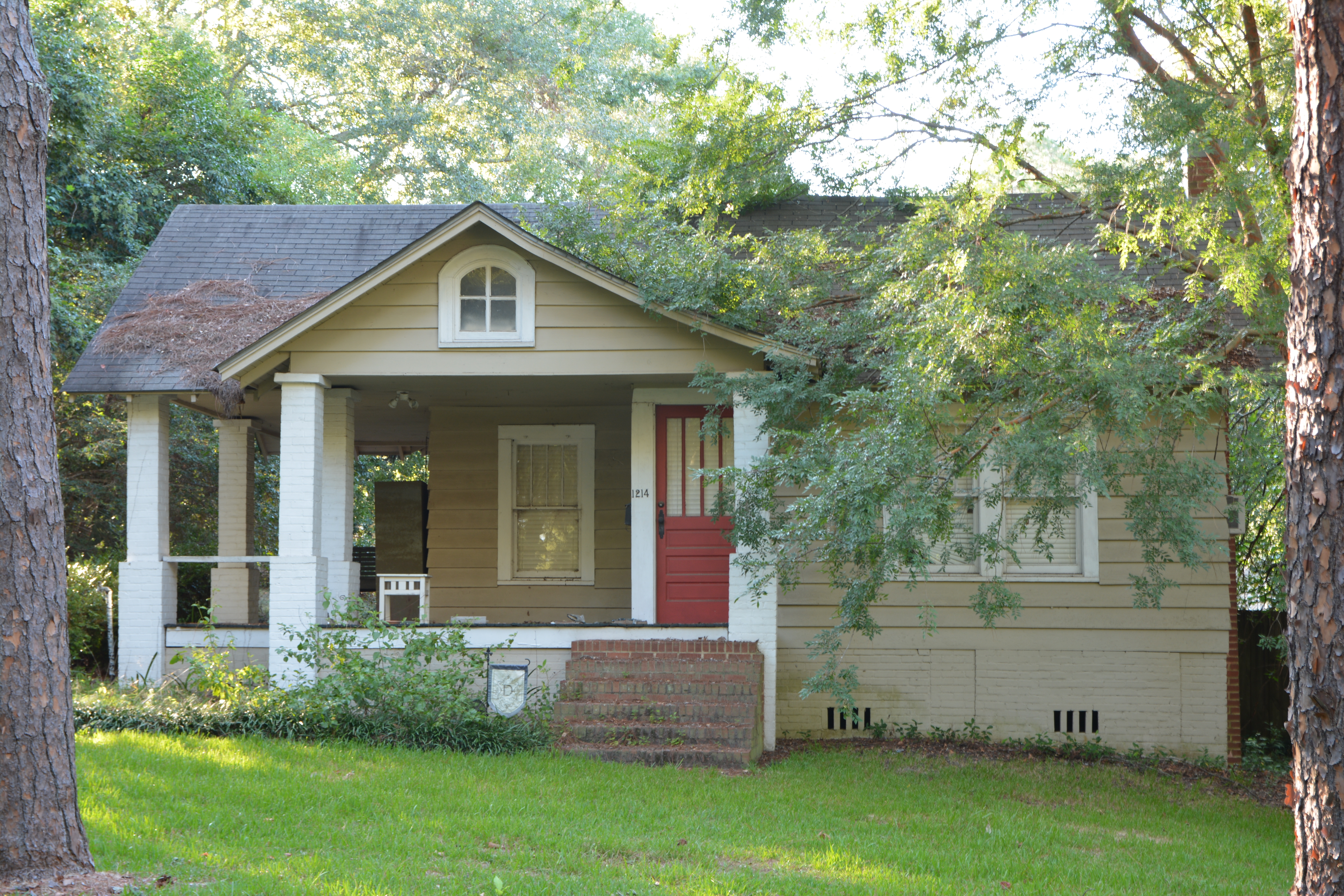
House at 1214 Love Ave

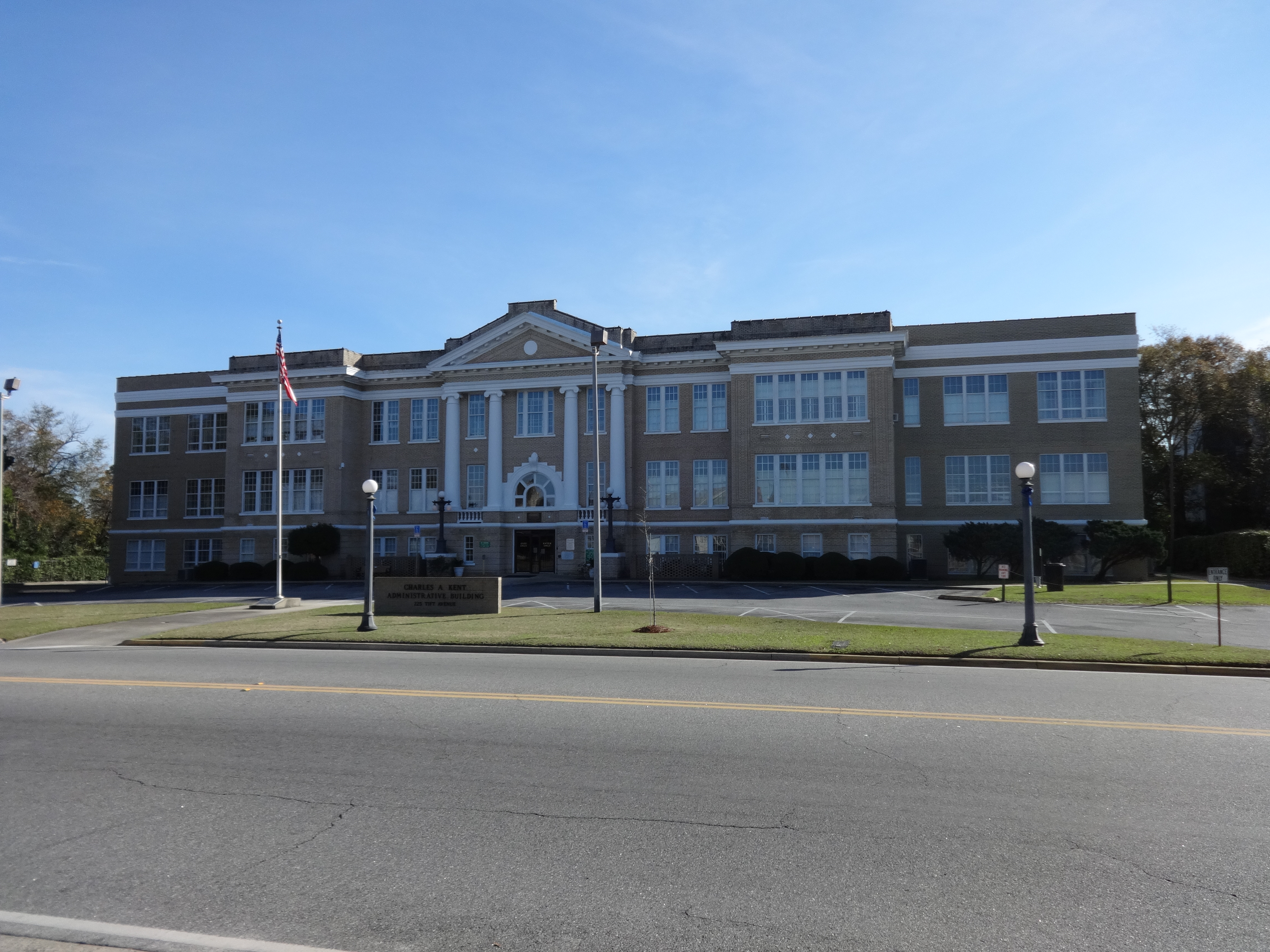
Old Tifton High School

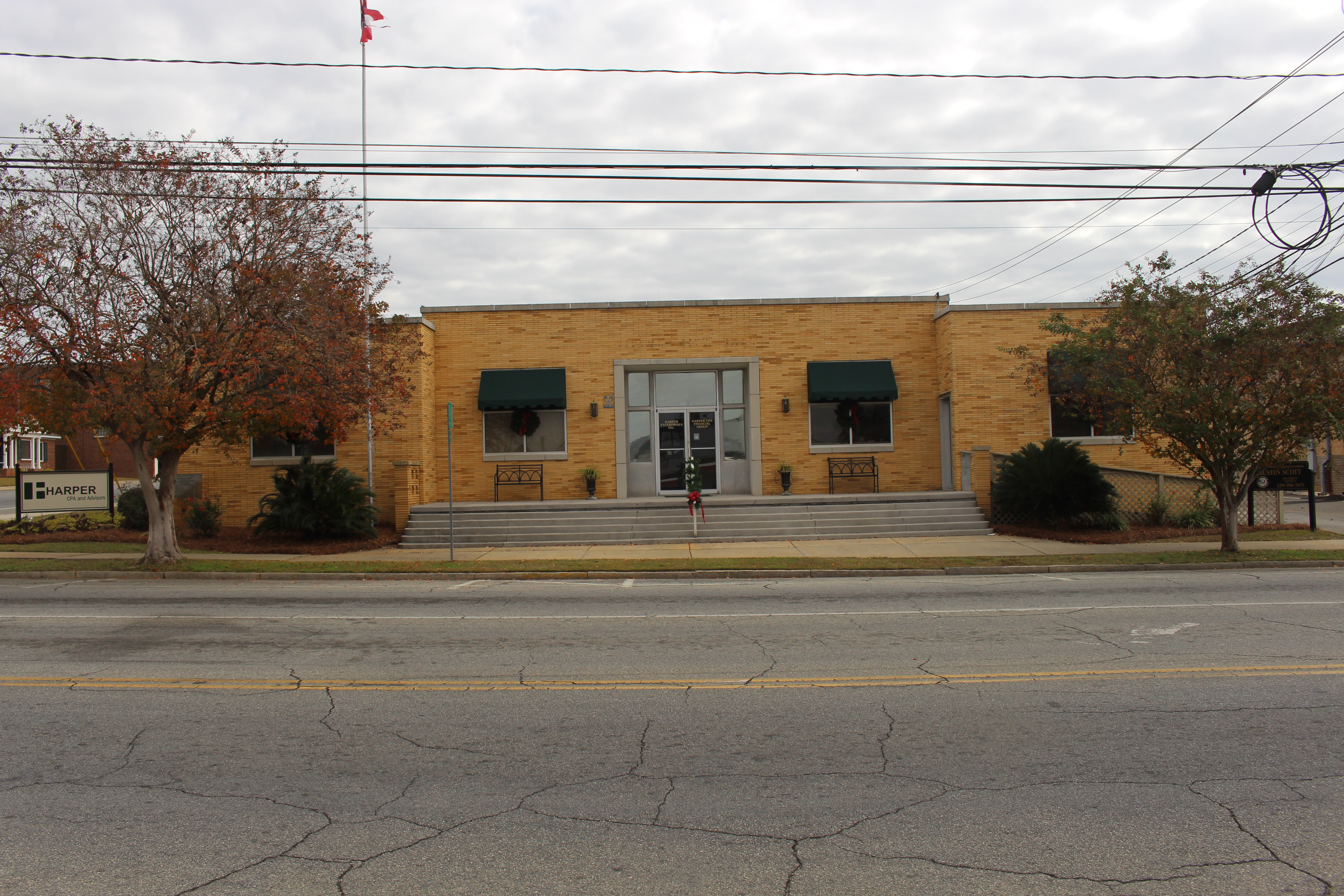
Old Tifton City Hall (1950)

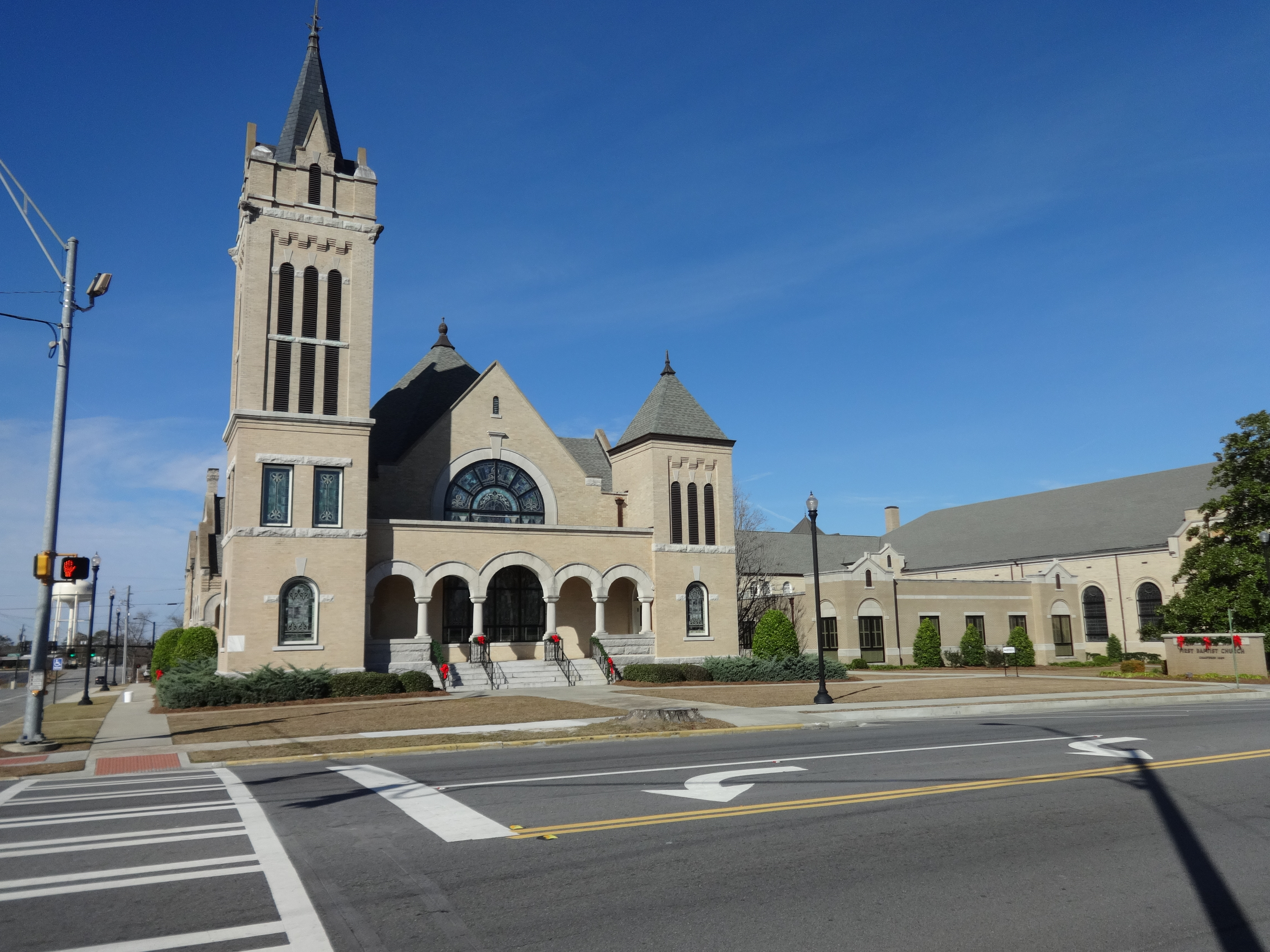
First Baptist Church (1906), 404 Love Ave

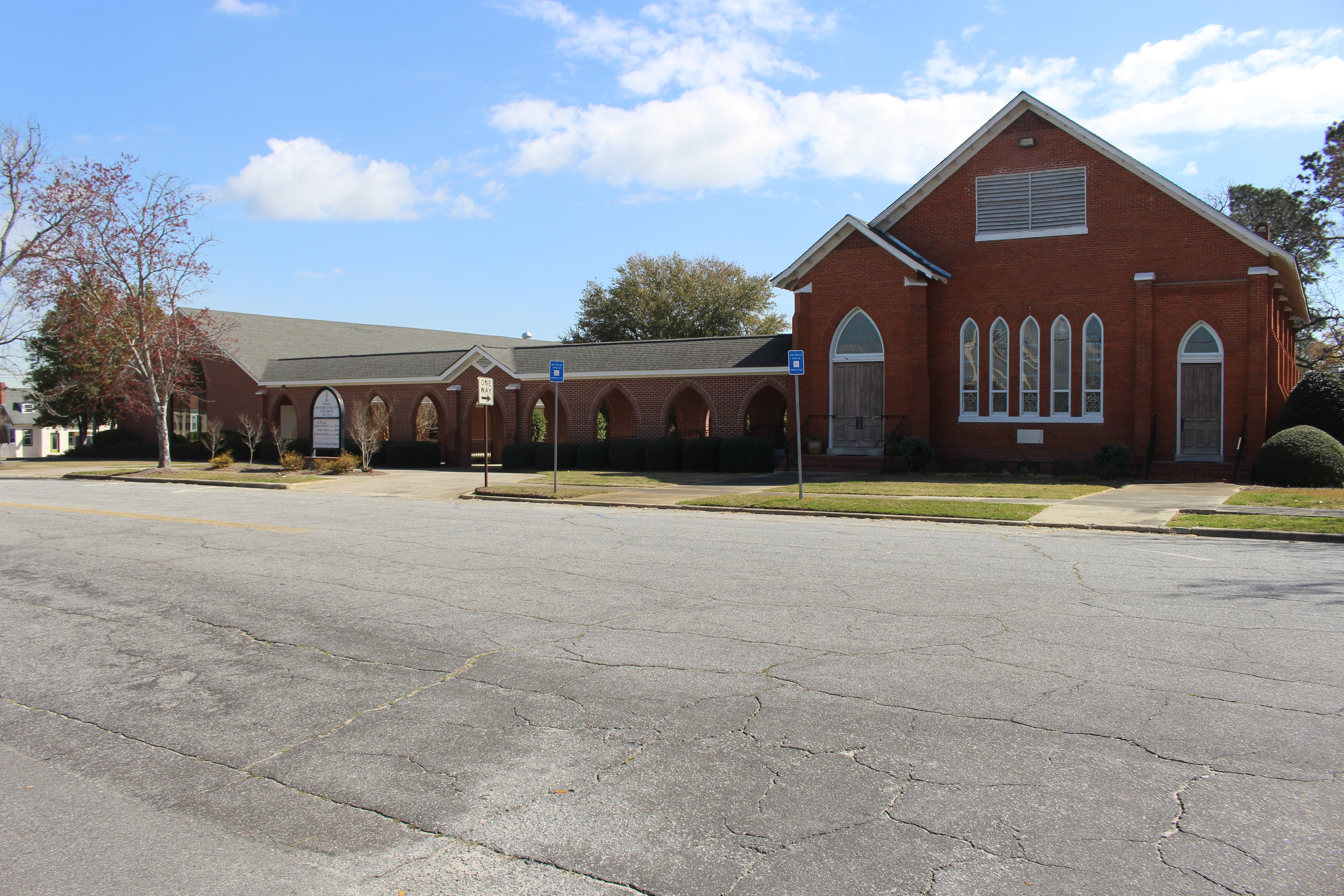
First Presbyterian Church (1911), 217 N. Park Ave.

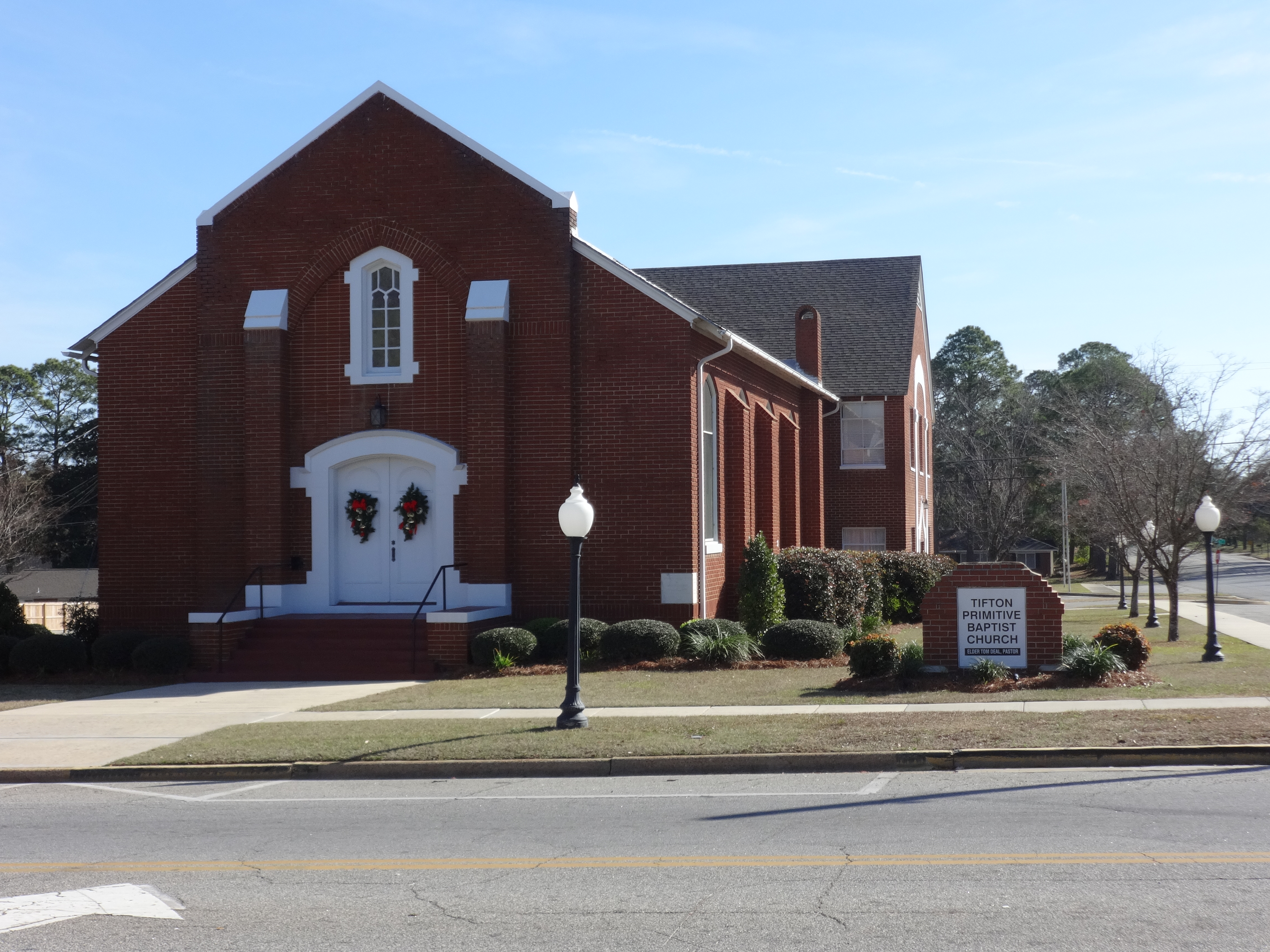
Tifton Primitive Baptist Church (1917), 401 Tift Ave

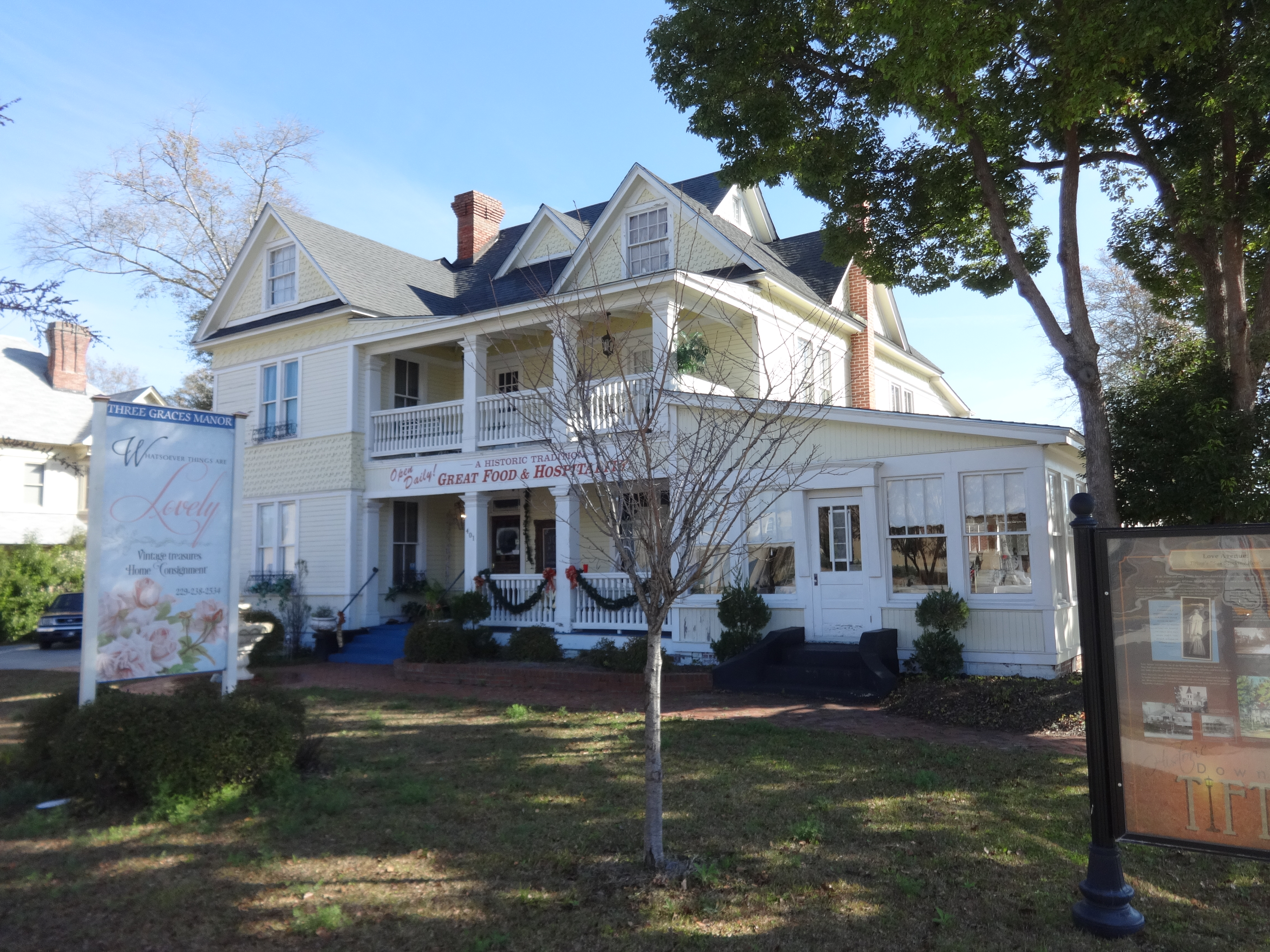
"Three Graces Manor" (1892), 401 Love Ave

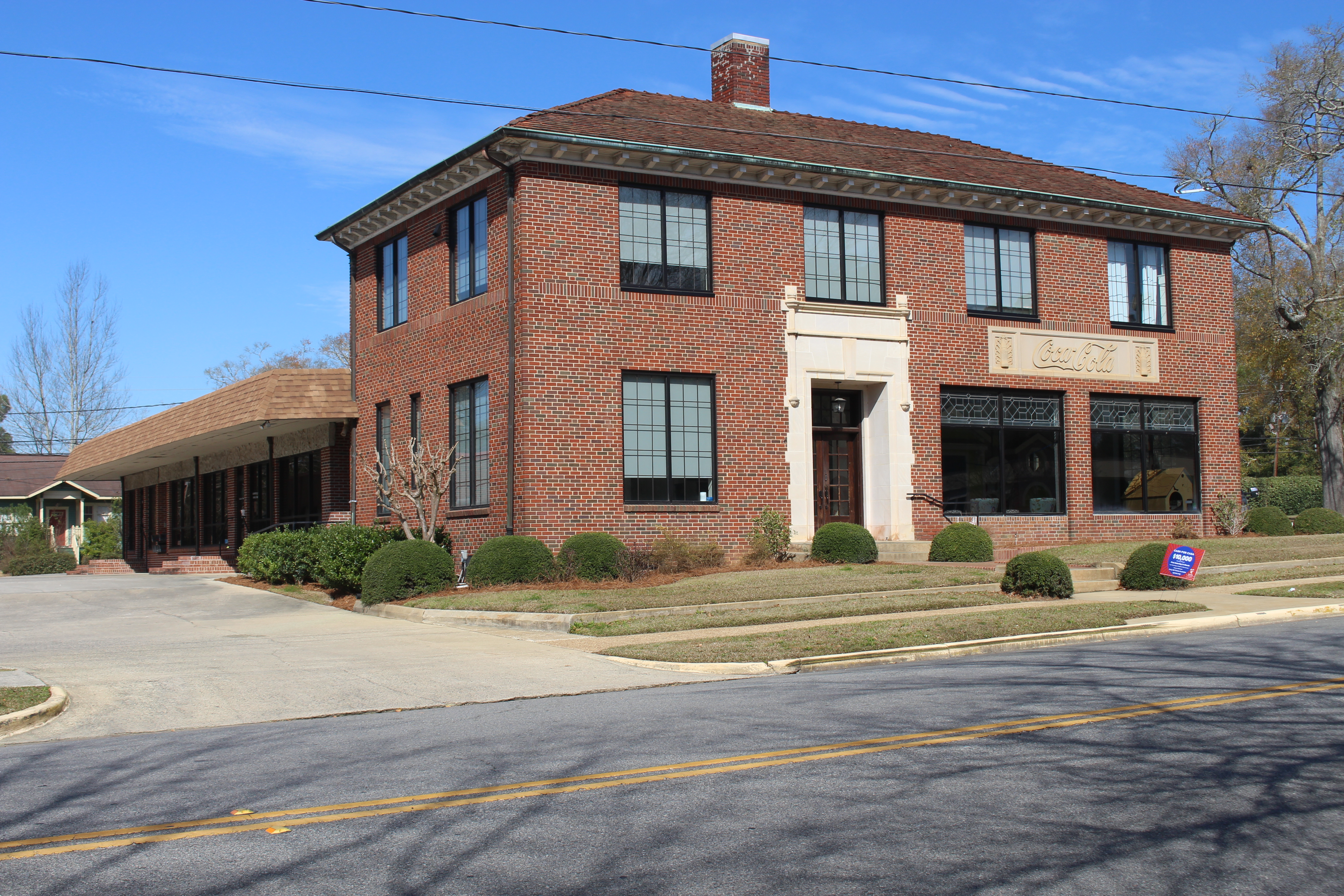
Coca-Cola building, Tifton (SE corner)

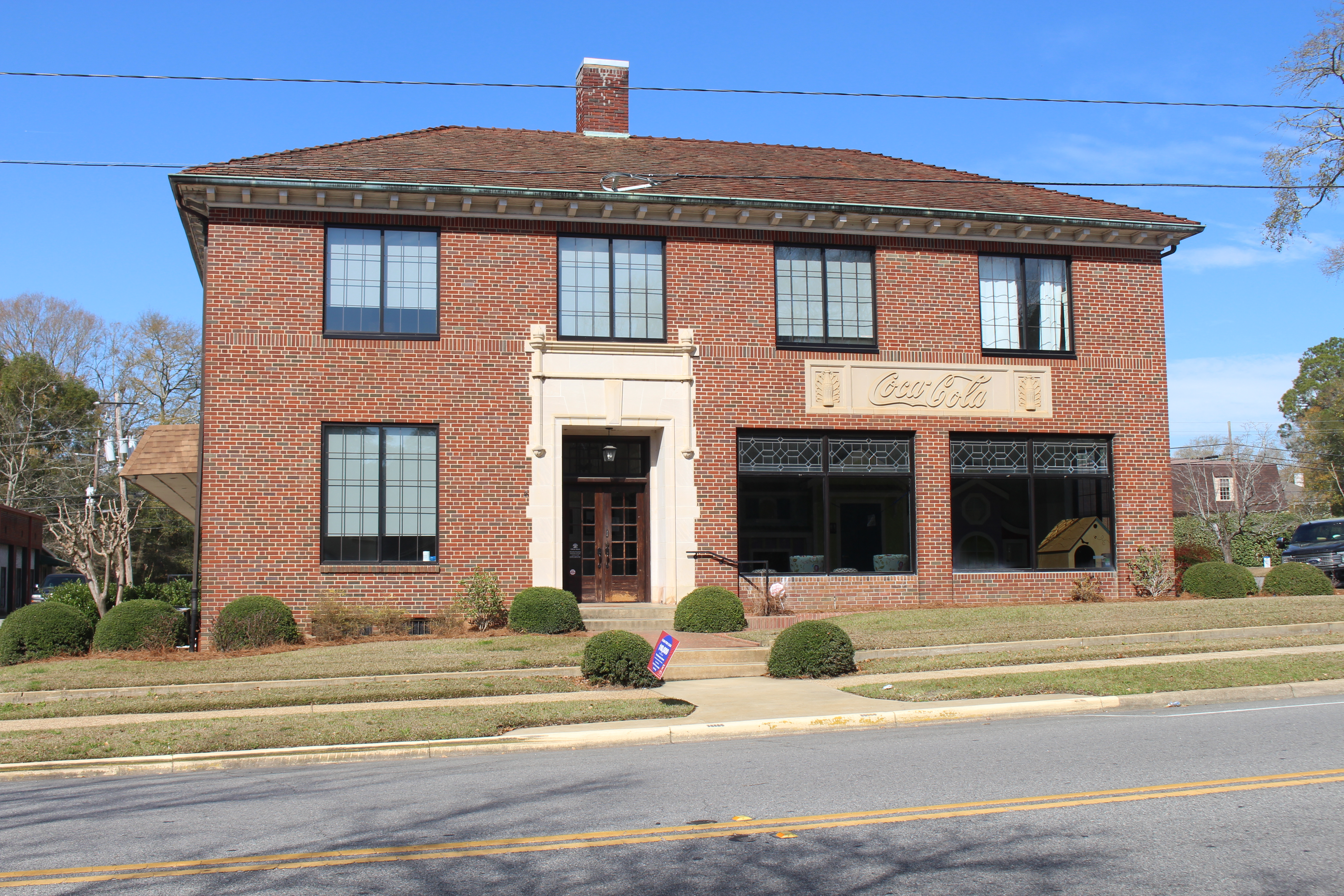
Coca-Cola building, Tifton (East face)

== See also ==
- Tifton Commercial Historic District
