= Tift County Courthouse =

- U.S. National Register of Historic Places
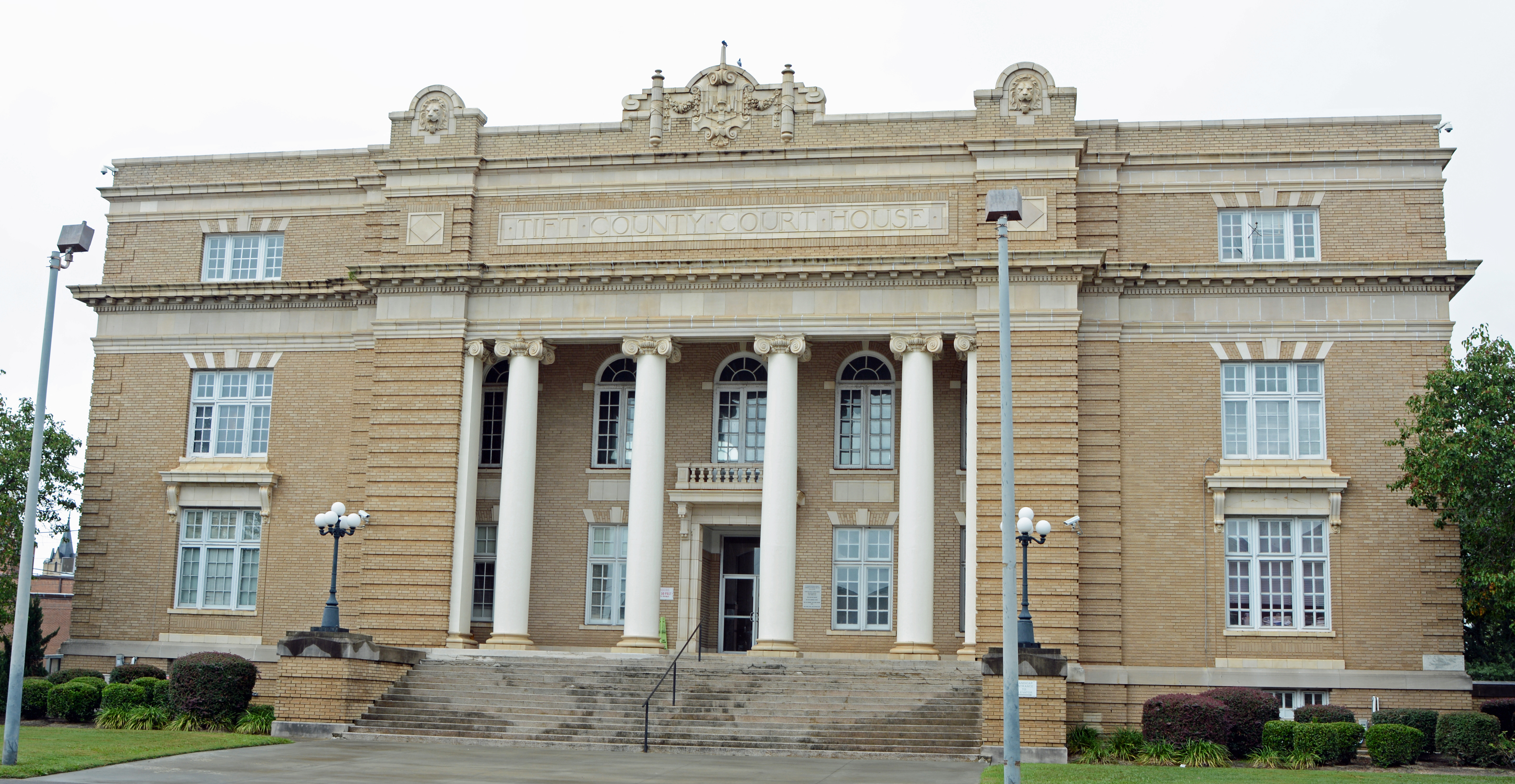

- Location within Georgia Location within the United States
- Location: Tifton, Georgia
- Coordinates: 31.45437°N 83.50803°W
- Built: 1912
- Architect: Edwards, W.A.; Jenkins, J.F.,& Co.
- Architectural style: Beaux Arts
- MPS: Georgia County Courthouses TR
- NRHP reference No.: 80001245
- Added to NRHP: September 18, 1980

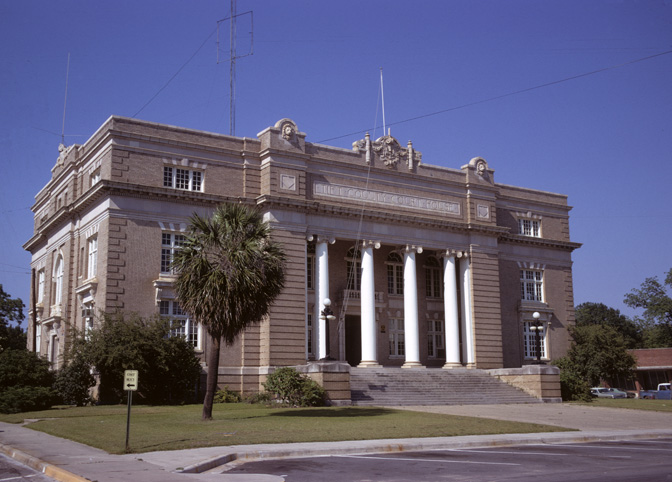
Tift County Courthouse in 1971, by Calvin Beale

The Tift County Courthouse, built in 1912-1913, is a historic courthouse building located in Tifton, Georgia. It was designed by Atlanta-based architect William Augustus Edwards who designed one other courthouse in Georgia, two in Florida and nine in South Carolina as well as academic buildings at 12 institutions in Florida, Georgia and South Carolina. On September 18, 1980, it was added to the National Register of Historic Places.

== See also ==
- National Register of Historic Places listings in Tift County, Georgia (includes the courthouse)
