= Snowden Mountain =

Mountain in Alaska, United States

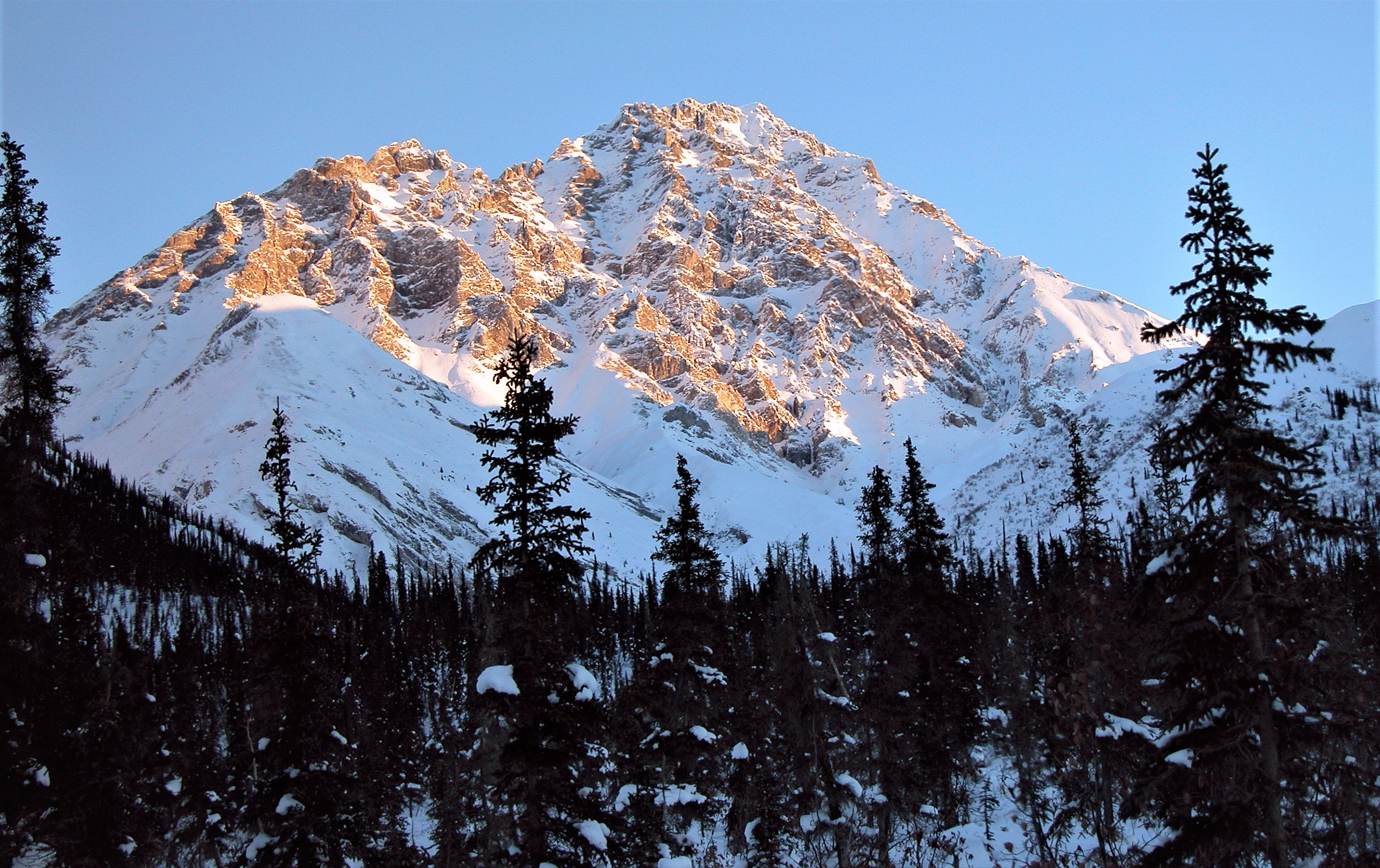
- Southwest aspect

Highest point
- Elevation: 6,420 ft (1,957 m)
- Prominence: 1,670 ft (509 m)
- Parent peak: Peak 6450
- Isolation: 5.64 mi (9.08 km)
- Coordinates: 67°47′51″N 149°41′44″W

Geography
- Location within Alaska
- Location: Yukon–Koyukuk; Alaska, United States
- Parent range: Brooks Range; Philip Smith Mountains
- Topo map: USGS Chandalar D-6 SE

Geology
- Rock age: Cambrian to Ordovician
- Rock type(s): schist, phyllite, marble

Snowden Mountain is a 6,420-foot-elevation (1,960-meter) mountain summit located in the Brooks Range, in the U.S. state of Alaska.

== Description ==
The mountain is situated 13 miles north of Sukakpak Mountain, 100 miles north of the Arctic Circle, and 200 miles north-northwest of Fairbanks. The peak lies along the east side of the Dietrich River valley, and can be seen from the Dalton Highway which traverses the valley. Topographic relief is significant as the summit rises 4,700 feet (1,400 meters) above the river in two miles.

The peak is set in the Snowden Mountain Area of Critical Environmental Concern, which is managed by the Bureau of Land Management. This ACEC is extremely rugged and was established to protect Dall sheep habitat on the southern slope of the Brooks Range.

The peak is named in association with Snowden Creek heading on its southeast slope, which in turn was named in 1939 by Robert Marshall for his Eskimo friend and hunting partner, Nutirwik, also known as Harry Snowden. The name has been officially adopted by the U.S. Board on Geographic Names.

== Climate ==
Based on the Köppen climate classification, Snowden Mountain is located in a subarctic climate zone with long, cold, winters, and short, cool summers. Winter temperatures can drop below −30 °F with wind chill factors below −50 °F. Precipitation runoff from the mountain drains west into the Dietrich River. The months June through August offer the most favorable weather for viewing and climbing.

== See also ==
- Brooks–British Range tundra
- Geography of Alaska
