= Dillon Mountain =

Mountain in Alaska, United States

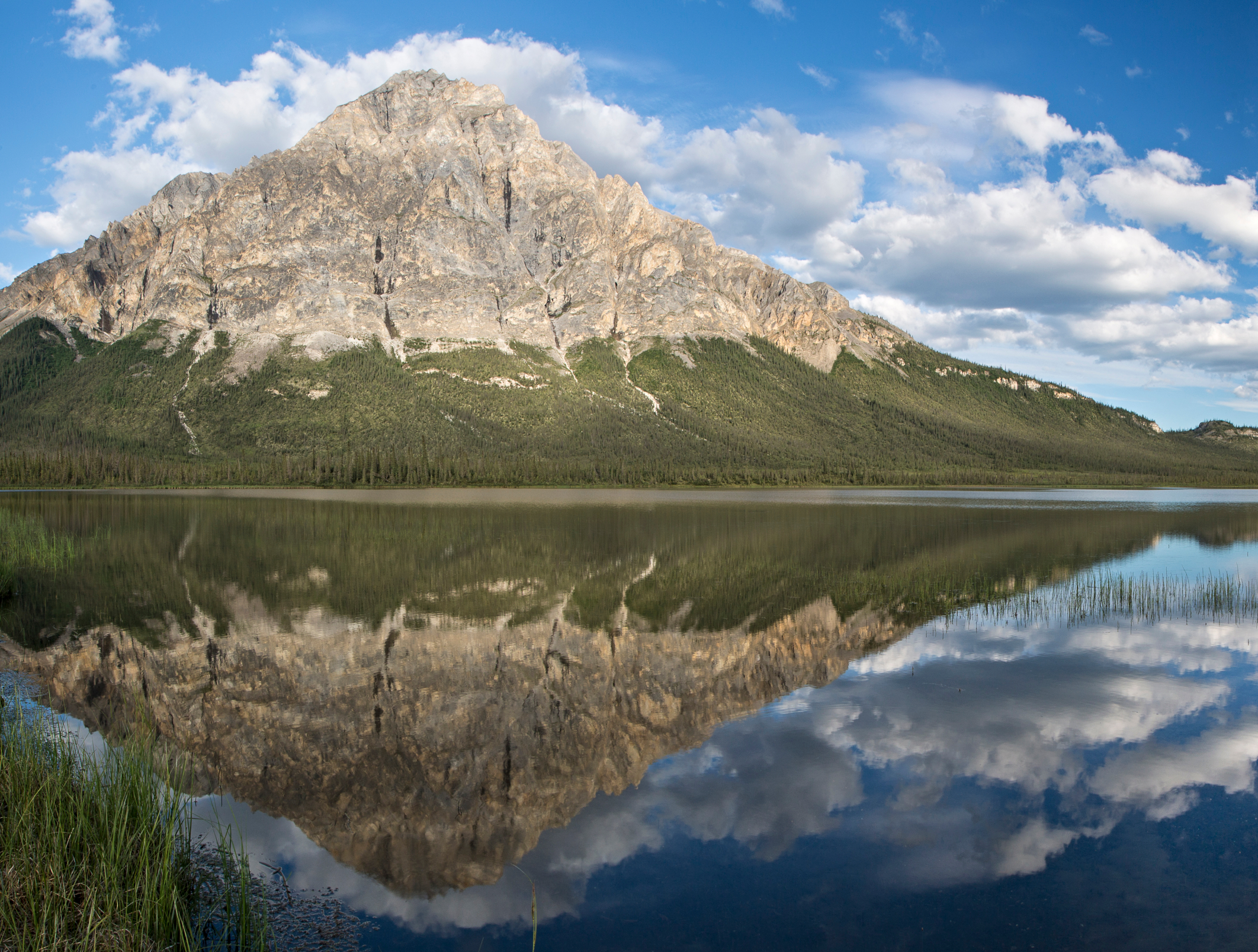
- Dillon Mountain, west aspect

Highest point
- Elevation: 4,820 ft (1,470 m)
- Prominence: 2,212 ft (674 m)
- Parent peak: Poss Mountain (6,180 ft)
- Isolation: 3.14 mi (5.05 km)
- Coordinates: 67°38′39″N 149°40′39″W

Geography
- Location within Alaska
- Interactive map of Dillon Mountain
- Country: United States
- State: Alaska
- Census Area: Yukon–Koyukuk
- Parent range: Philip Smith Mountains; Brooks Range
- Topo map: USGS Chandalar C-6

Geology
- Rock age: Devonian
- Rock type(s): limestone, marble

Climbing
- Easiest route: Scrambling South ridge

Dillon Mountain is a prominent 4,820-foot (1,469 meter) mountain summit located in the Philip Smith Mountains of the Brooks Range, in the U.S. state of Alaska. The peak is situated 93 miles north of the Arctic Circle near milepost 207 on the Dalton Highway, and 200 mi (322 km) north-northwest of Fairbanks, where the Bettles and Dietrich Rivers merge to form Middle Fork Koyukuk River. Sukakpak Mountain rises 3 mi (5 km) to the southwest, and Dietrich Camp of the Trans-Alaska Pipeline lies 3 mi (5 km) to the northwest. The peak was named after John Thomas Dillon (1947–1987), a geologist with the Alaska Division of Geological and Geophysical Surveys who mapped the geology of the southern Brooks Range mineral belt. He died with his father, Stephen Patrick Dillon, in an airplane crash in the Brooks Range while returning home from field work in July 1987. The name was officially adopted in 1990 by the U.S. Board on Geographic Names. This landmark is notable for its massive west face composed of Skajit limestone rising nearly 3,400 feet (1,035 m) above the surrounding valley.

== Climate ==
Based on the Köppen climate classification, Dillon Mountain is located in a subarctic climate zone with long, cold, winters, and short, cool summers. Temperatures can drop below −30 °C (−22 °F) with wind chill factors below −50 °C (−58 °F). The months June through August offer the most favorable weather for viewing and climbing.

== Gallery ==
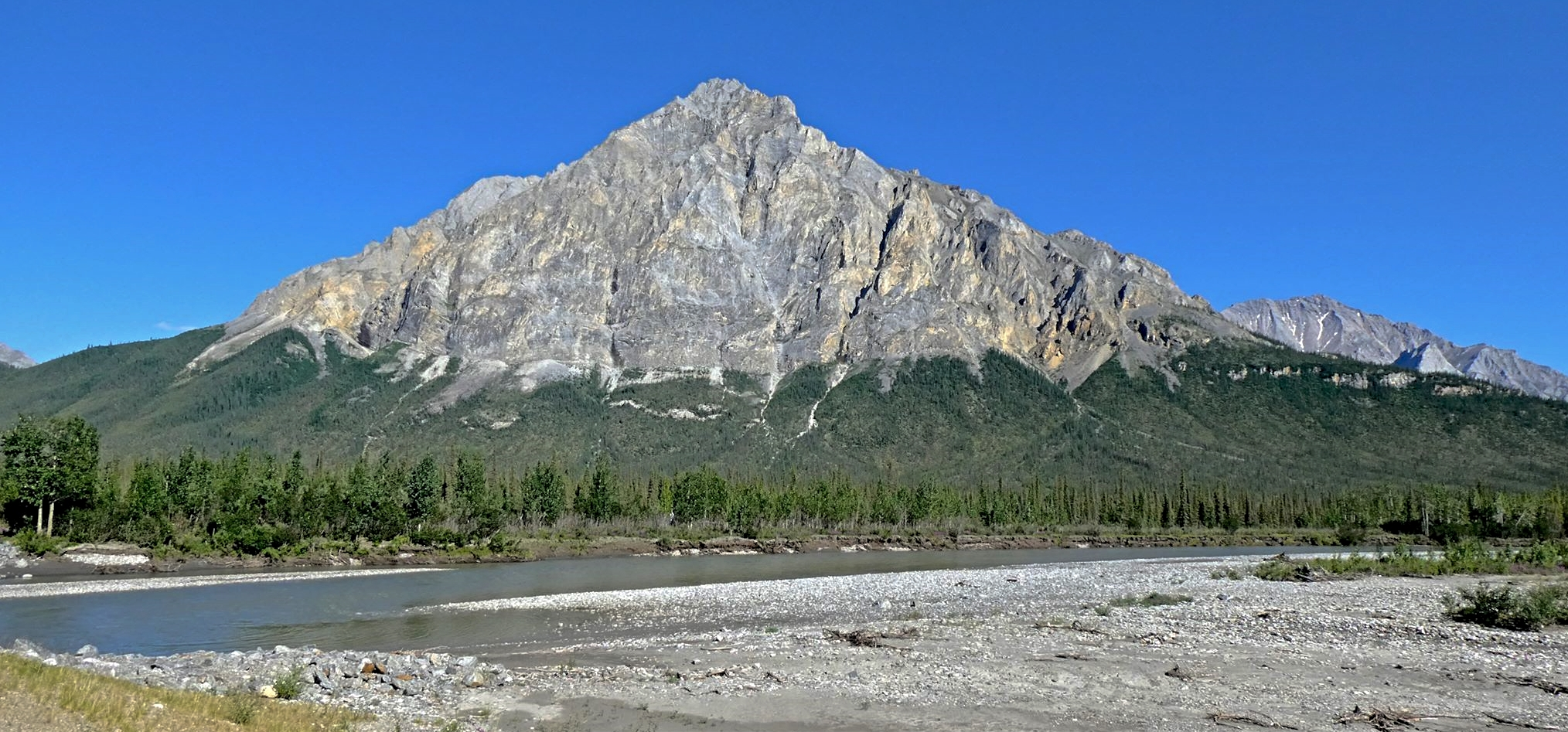
Dillon Mountain, Dietrich River

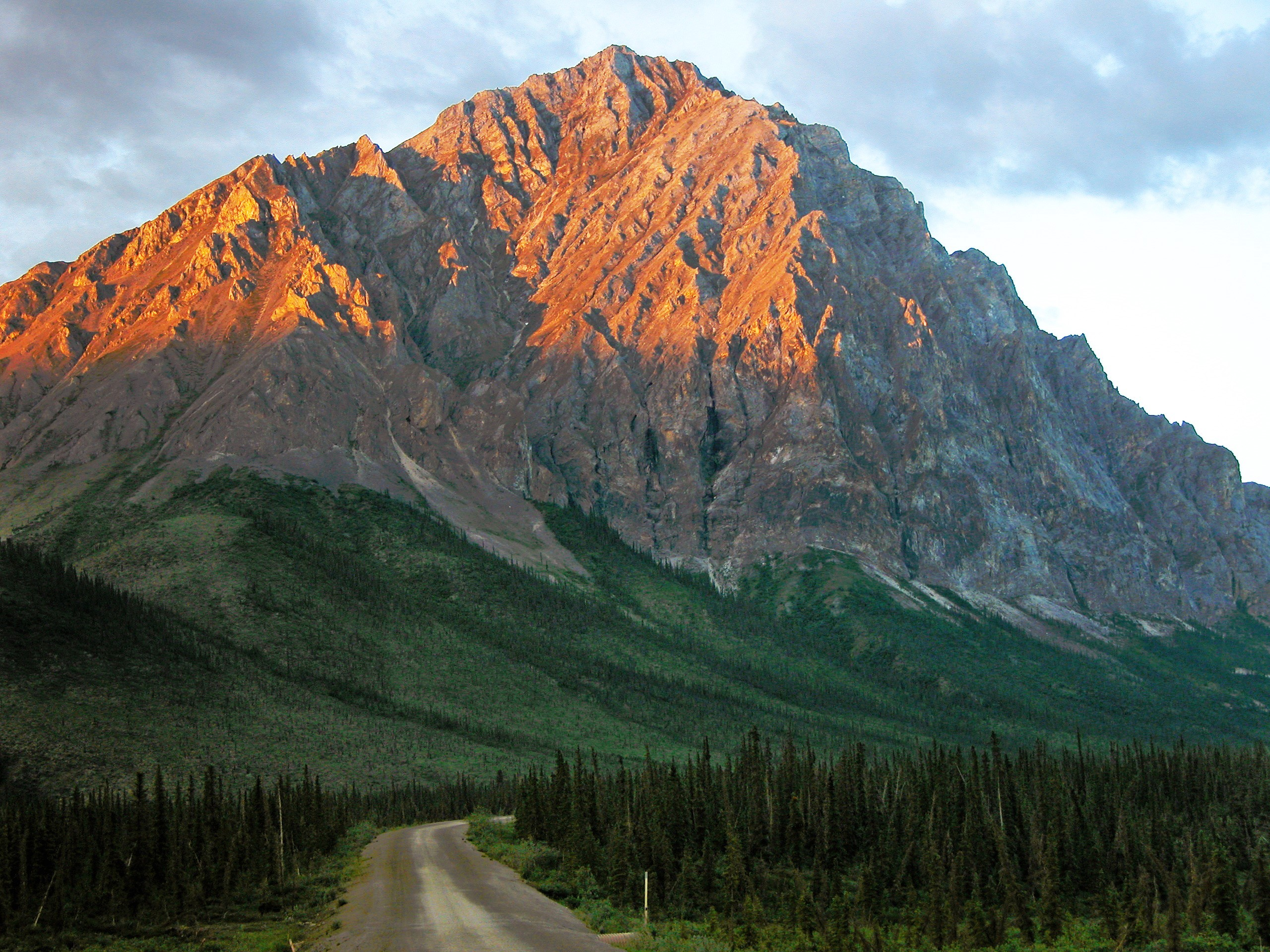
Northwest aspect

== See also ==
- List of mountain peaks of Alaska
- Geography of Alaska
