= Brooks–British Range tundra =

Tundra ecoregion of Canada and the United States

Brooks-British Range tundra
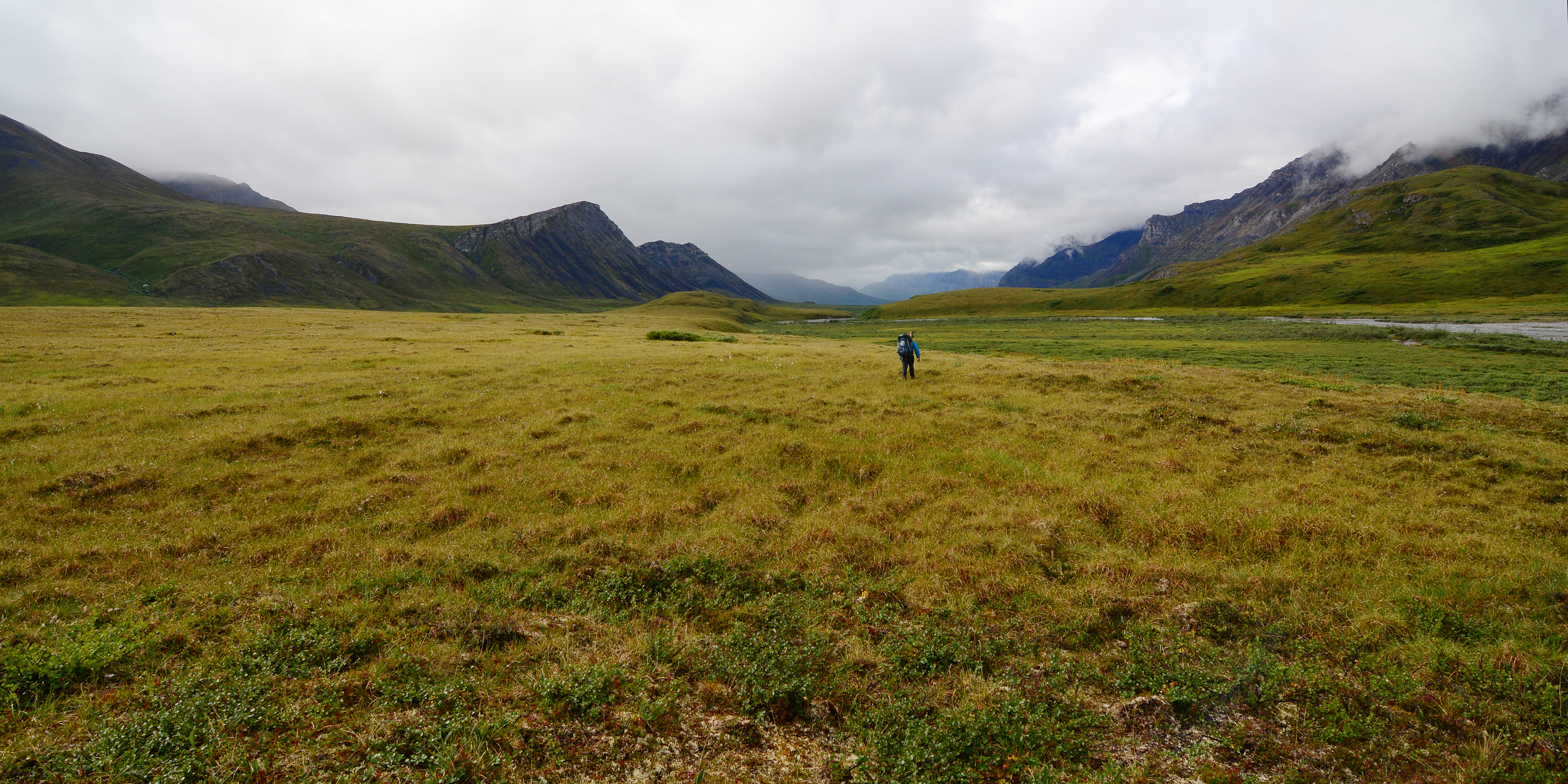
- Mountainous tundra of the Anaktuvuk River Valley in Gates of the Arctic National Park, Alaska

- 1108. Brooks-British Range tundra

Ecology
- Realm: Nearctic
- Biome: Tundra
- Borders: Arctic foothills tundra; Interior Alaska–Yukon lowland taiga; Interior Yukon–Alaska alpine tundra, Northwest Territories taiga
- Bird species: golden eagle and gyrfalcons
- Mammal species: Caribou. Grizzly Bear, Gray Wolf, Smith's longspur, horned lark, Dall sheep, snowshoe hare, red fox, and Arctic ground squirrel

Geography
- Area: 159,543.3 km^{2} (61,600.0 mi^{2})
- Countries: United States; Canada
- State/Territory: Alaska; Yukon; Northwest Territories
- Elevation: 800m to 2400m

Conservation
- Conservation status: Relatively stable/intact
- Global 200: Yes
- Habitat loss: 0%
- Protected: 60.3%

The Brooks–British Range tundra is an ecoregion spanning North America and Canada, and is one of the WWF Global 200 ecoregions.

== Geography ==
The Brooks–British Range tundra extends east and west along the Brooks Range which runs across northern Alaska and northeastern Yukon Territory. The Brooks Range is divided into western and eastern sections by the Anaktuvuk Pass. The Western Brooks Range is relatively low, while the Eastern Brooks Range is higher and more rugged, with larger areas of permanent ice and snow. The southern slopes of the Brooks Range are drained by the Yukon River, which empties westwards into the Bering Sea. The north slope drains northward into the Arctic Ocean.

The British Range extends southwards from the eastern end of the Brooks Range, forming the divide between the Yukon and Mackenzie river basins and the boundary between the Yukon and Northwest territories.

== Protected areas ==
60.3% of the ecoregion is in protected areas. Protected areas include:

- Ivvavik National Park
- Vuntut National Park
- Gates of the Arctic National Park
- Arctic National Wildlife Refuge
- Gates of the Arctic Wilderness
- Noatak Wilderness
- Mollie Beattie Wilderness
- Central Arctic Management Area Wilderness Study Area
- Galbraith Lake Area of Critical Environmental Concern
- Poss Mountain Area of Critical Environmental Concern
- Snowden Mountain Area of Critical Environmental Concern
- Sukakpak Mountain Area of Critical Environmental Concern
- Toolik Lake Research Natural Area Area of Critical Environmental Concern
- West Fork Atigun River Area of Critical Environmental Concern
- Nigu-Iteriak Area of Critical Environmental Concern
- Nugget Creek Area of Critical Environmental Concern
- Western Arctic Caribou Insect Relief Area of Critical Environmental Concern
- Neruokpuk Lakes Conservation Area
- Firth-Mancha Research Natural Area
- Shublik Springs Research Natural Area
- Ivishak River Wild & Scenic River Corridor
- Sheenjek River Wild & Scenic River Corridor
- Wind River Wild & Scenic River Corridor

=== Biosphere ===
Fauna

Despite its harsh terrain this ecoregion is able to support a surprising amount of crenatures. Mammalian predators include brown and black bears, red and Arctic foxes, wolves, and wolverines. Common herbivores include moose, mountain goats, and Dall sheep. Smaller mammals include but not limited to grounds squirrel, lemmings, pika, and snowshoe hares. Many avian species make their home here as well including golden eagles, owls, gyrfalcons, tundra swans, sparrows, and northern shrikes. Only one species of amphibian lives here and that is the wood frog while no reptile species lives in this region. This ecosystem is also seasonal migration spot for three different caribou herds (porcupines and central and western) in the river valley. Due to the environment they are in, many of these animals have adaptions that as specifically adapted to an ecosystem like this.

Flora

Unlike the fauna of this ecosystem very little species of plant can survive this harsh environment. Amongst those include prostrate and hemi prostrate dwarf shrubs like the gray leaf willow, bog blueberry, and Arctic mountain heather as well as erect dwarf shrubs like the Richardson's willow and the Lapland rosebay. Other vegetation includes horsetails, lichen, and a variety of different mosses. Most vegetation in this reason is located in valleys or lower slopes very few can live further up in the northern drainage side with the exception of the balsam poplar and a variety of lichen.

=== Human use and impact ===
Due to the harsh terrain very little commercial uses are supported by the ecosystem, however, on the western edge of the ecoregion small mining operation for materials (mainly zinc and lead) are present. Most of the human use of this land is big game hunting or subsistence use (management of land in a way that provides essential foods and basic goods necessary for the local communities).

=== Threats and Conservation ===
 This eco region is mostly intact but could possibly be under threat from the expansion of mining within the area. Also concern about the Alaska Pipeline (oil pipeline), the Dalton Highway, and the Dempster Highway pass having impact on the region through the very high likelihood that there will be an increase of development around this area, disrupting the natural environment. To combat these problems a list of priority action has been established for the next 10 years. Some of these methods include prohibiting incompatible (mining) use in protected areas of the ecoregion, manage hunting and recreation usage specifically on the highways, and protect and monitor vulnerable species.[6]

== See also ==
- List of ecoregions in Canada (WWF)
- List of ecoregions in the United States (WWF)
