= Gregg Ritz's Primitive Instinct =

Primitive Instinct is an American documentary-style reality television show created by professional hunter Gregg Ritz for the Outdoor Channel. It follows Ritz’s adventure hunting conquests through a variety of landscapes, focusing on the hunting culture of the Northeast and other regions. It was aired in the summer of 2011.

== History ==
Ritz is a professional hunter who specializes in technical muzzleloading and archery. After acquiring ownership of the Ohio, United States hunting lodge, Hunt Master’s Lodge, Ritz began hosting the Outdoor Channel’s television show, Hunt Masters. The show centered on a variety of expert hunters engaging in challenging hunting adventures, but Ritz was soon given the opportunity by the Outdoor Channel to host his own show in the form of Primitive Instinct.

== Synopsis ==
Primitive Instinct is a show of the newly-forming hardcore outdoor television genre, focusing on Ritz’s adventures through the unforgiving landscapes of British Columbia, Midwestern farm belts, and other prime hunting regions. Ritz employs his muzzleloading and archery expertise by taking down big game, including Yukon moose, cliff-dwelling stone sheep, and Boone & Crockett whitetails. The show is intended to entertain as well as educate by incorporating survival skills and hunting strategy in response to harsh natural conditions.
