= Arctic Village =

Arctic Village may refer to:

- Arctic Village, Alaska
- Arctic Village (book)
- China's Arctic village
