= Middle Fork Koyukuk River =

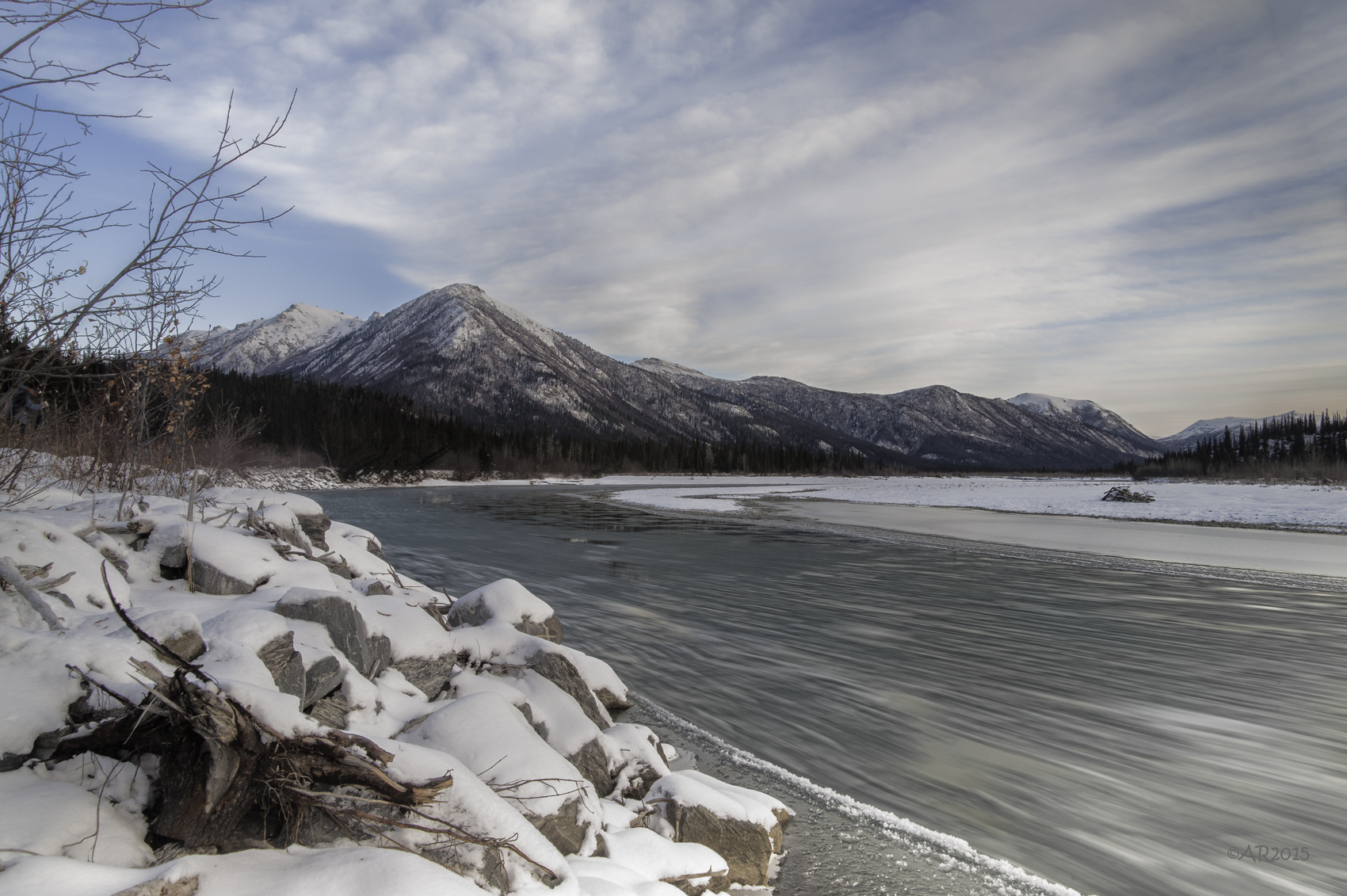

- Location of the mouth of the Middle Fork Koyukuk River in Alaska

Location
- Country: United States
- State: Alaska
- Census Area: Yukon–Koyukuk

Physical characteristics
- Source: Confluence of Bettles and Dietrich rivers
  - location: near Wiseman, Brooks Range
  - coordinates: 67°38′26″N 149°44′29″W
  - elevation: 1,419 ft (433 m)
- Mouth: Koyukuk River
  - coordinates: 67°02′30″N 151°04′00″W
  - elevation: 724 ft (221 m)
- Length: 62 mi (100 km)

The Middle Fork Koyukuk River is a 62-mile (100 km) tributary of the Koyukuk River in the U.S. state of Alaska. Formed by the confluence of the Bettles and Dietrich rivers near Wiseman on the southern flank of the Brooks Range, the Middle Fork flows generally southwest to its confluence with the North Fork Koyukuk River, with which it forms the main stem of the Koyukuk.

From its starting point slightly north of Sukakpak Mountain, the river flows generally south or southwest in its upper reaches. The Dalton Highway and the TransAlaska Pipeline run roughly parallel to the river between its source and a point between Twelvemile Mountain, on the river's right, and Cathedral Mountain, on the left, south of Coldfoot. Further south, at Tramway Bar, the river turns generally west to its confluence with the North Fork Koyukuk River.

== Boating ==
The Middle Fork is suitable for boating by a wide variety of watercraft for its entire length. It is rated Class I (easy) on the International Scale of River Difficulty. Dangers include bridge abutments on the upper reaches and black and grizzly bears.

The river is highly accessible from various points along the Dalton Highway. Chartered planes can land at Dietrich, near the head of the Middle Fork, and regularly scheduled flights serve Wiseman and Coldfoot. Further downstream along the main stem of the Koyukuk River, scheduled flights serve Bettles and Allakaket.

== See also ==
- List of rivers of Alaska
