= Poss Mountain =

Mountain in Alaska, United States

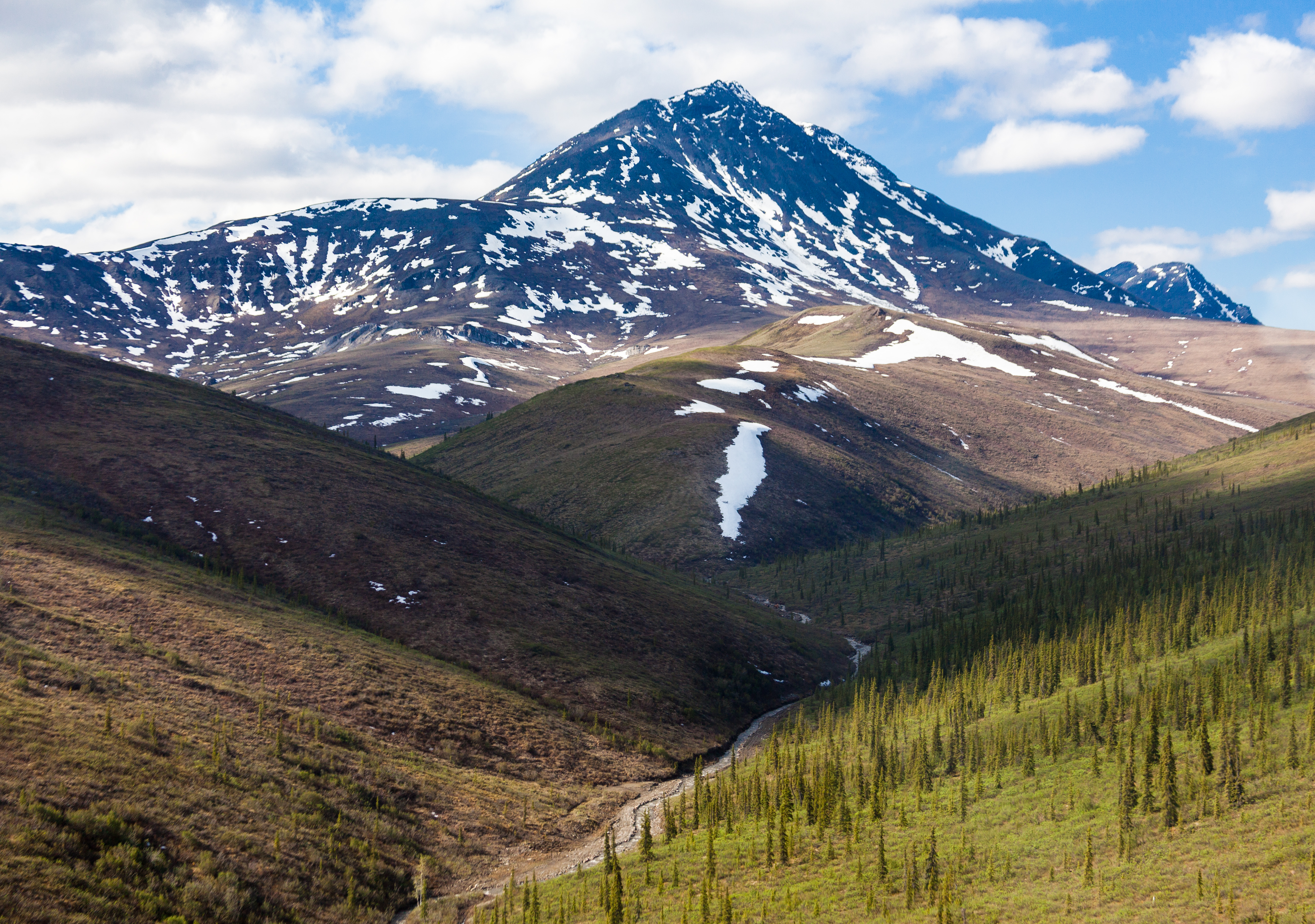
- Poss Mountain above Gold Creek, north aspect

Highest point
- Elevation: 6,180 ft (1,880 m)
- Prominence: 4,380 ft (1,340 m)
- Parent peak: Peak 6450
- Isolation: 23.2 mi (37.3 km)
- Coordinates: 67°25′35″N 149°41′45″W

Geography
- Location within Alaska
- Location: Yukon–Koyukuk; Alaska, United States
- Parent range: Philip Smith Mountains; Brooks Range
- Topo map: USGS Chandalar B-6

Poss Mountain is a prominent 6,180-foot (1,880 meter) mountain summit located in the Philip Smith Mountains of the Brooks Range, in the U.S. state of Alaska. The peak is situated 80 miles north of the Arctic Circle, five miles east of Dalton Highway, 11.3 mi (18 km) south of Sukakpak Mountain, and 190 mi (306 km) north-northwest of Fairbanks. The peak was named about 1930 by wilderness activist Robert Marshall after "Poss" Postlethwaite, an early and old gold prospector in this area around Wiseman. Robert Marshall described the then 78-year-old Postlethwaite as "the oldest man in the Koyukuk," having spent 32 winters in the area. The name was officially adopted in 1932 by the U.S. Board on Geographic Names. The Poss Mountain Research Natural Area (8,042 acres) was designated in 1991 to protect natural mineral licks and lambing habitat for Dall sheep. Precipitation runoff from the mountain drains into tributaries of the Middle and South Forks of Koyukuk River.

== Climate ==
Based on the Köppen climate classification, Poss Mountain is located in a subarctic climate zone with long, cold, winters, and short, cool summers. Temperatures can drop below −30 °C with wind chill factors below −50 °C. The months June through August offer the most favorable weather for viewing and climbing.

== See also ==
- List of mountain peaks of Alaska
- Geography of Alaska
