= Bettles River =

River in Alaska, United States

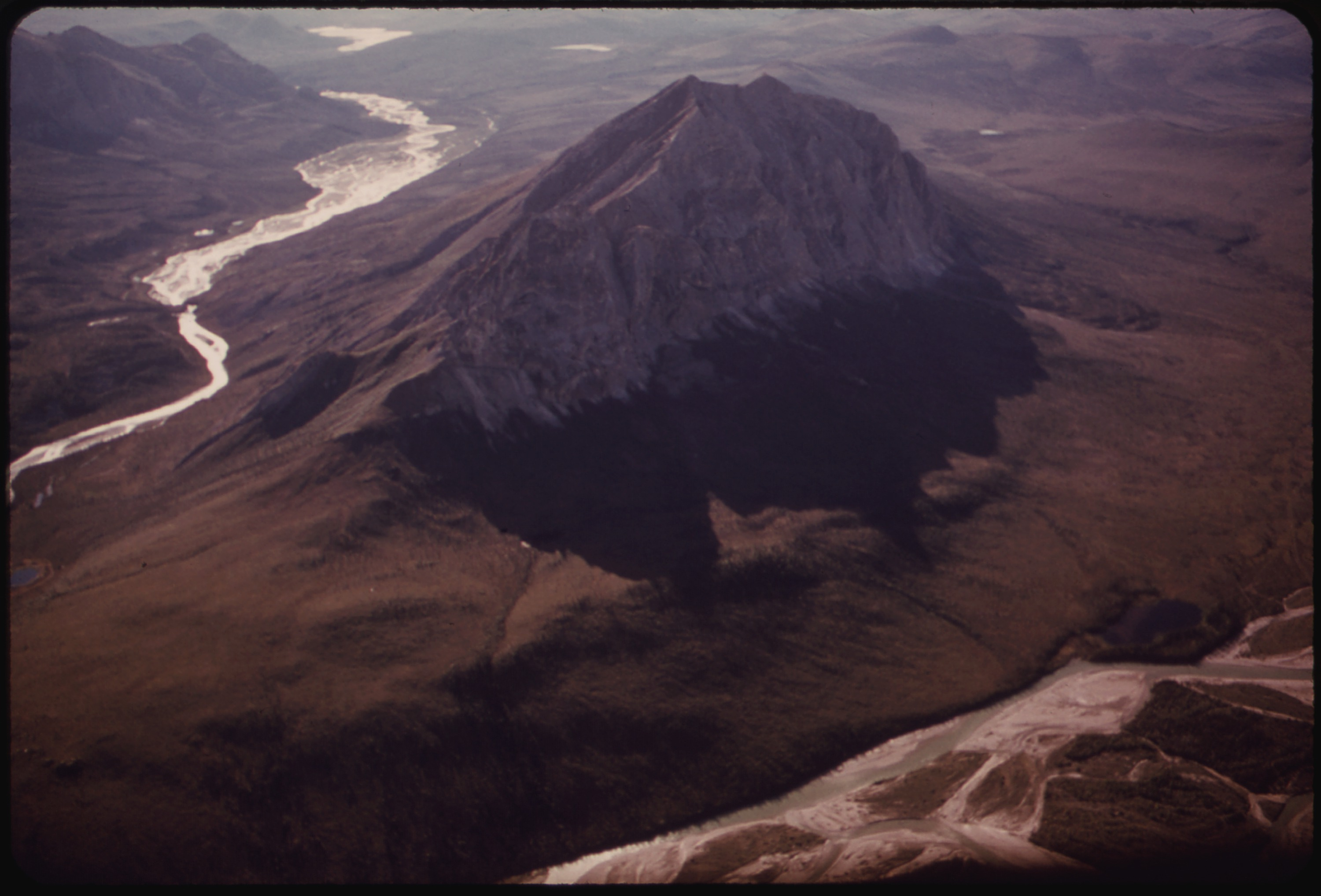
- View towards south-southeast of Sukakpak Mountain; the Bettles River (left), flows into the Dietrich River to form the Middle Fork Koyukuk River (right)

- Location in Alaska

Physical characteristics
- Source
  - coordinates: 67.5930556°N 149.2505556°W
- Mouth
  - location: Dietrich River and Middle Fork Koyukuk River
  - coordinates: 67.6425000°N 149.7422222°W
  - elevation: 433 meters (1,421 ft)

Basin features
- River system: Yukon River

The Bettles River is a river in the Yukon-Koyukuk Census Area of Alaska. The headwarters originate at the junction of Robert and Phoebe Creeks, from where it flows west to join the Dietrich River in forming the Middle Fork Koyukuk River.

It was named in 1899 by miners in the area for Gordon C. Bettles of the firm Pickarts, Bettles, and Pickarts, owners of the trading post at Bergman. The Bureau of Land Management allows recreational gold panning in the river, though projected gold potential is low.
