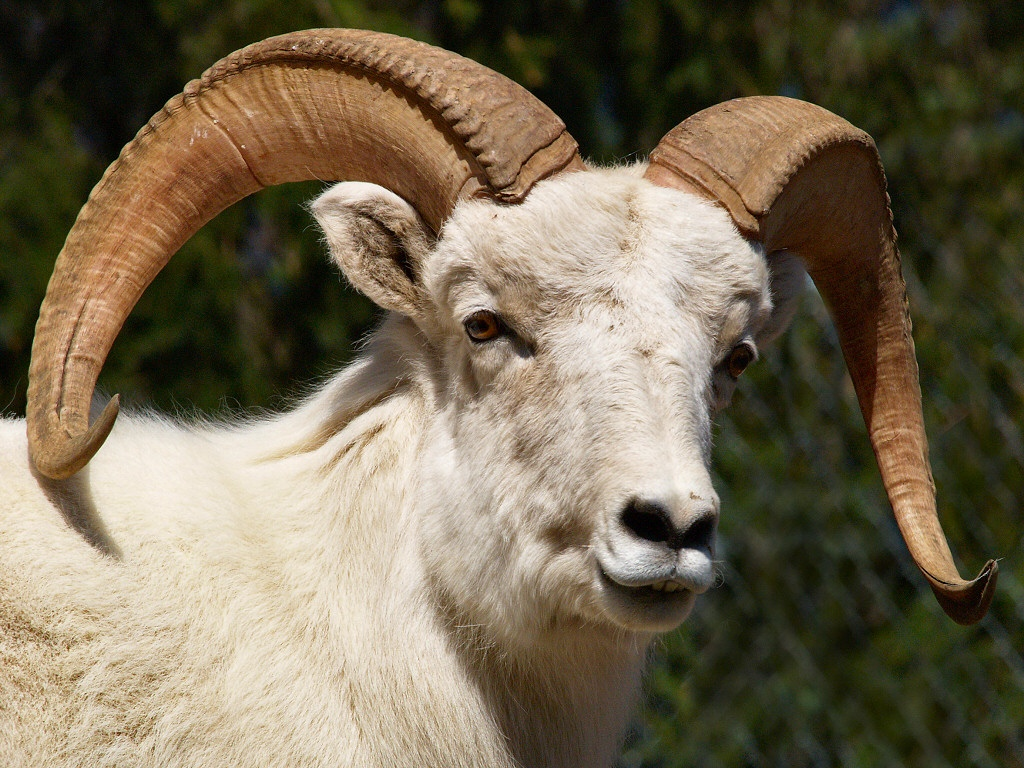

Scientific classification
- Kingdom: Animalia
- Phylum: Chordata
- Class: Mammalia
- Order: Artiodactyla
- Family: Bovidae
- Subfamily: Caprinae
- Genus: Ovis
- Species: O. dalli
- Subspecies: O. d. dalli

Trinomial name
- Ovis dalli dalli Nelson, 1884

= Ovis dalli dalli =

Subspecies of thinhorn sheep

Ovis dalli dalli, the Dall sheep or Dall's sheep, is a subspecies of thinhorn sheep. Like other sheep, they are large herbivores, feeding primarily on grass and other plants. They are endemic to northwestern North America, in Canada and Alaska.

== Appearance ==
These sheep are about 1.5 m high and can weigh up to 110 kg. The female sheep have small, tan horns and the male sheep have larger horns that become more twisted as they age. The wool of Dall's sheep is almost pure white.

The sheep's horns grow fastest in warm weather and slowest in cold weather. This puts rings in the horns called annuli. The number of rings shows how old the sheep is.

This type of thinhorn sheep can interbreed with stone sheep. These thinhorn sheep are sometimes called Fannin's sheep.

Most Dall sheep live to be about 12 years old, but some ewes live to be 16 or even 19.

== Distribution ==
There are about 100,000 Dall sheep in the wild. They are found in Alaska in the Kenai Peninsula and Brooks Range. They live in Canada's Yukon and Northwest Territories in the Mackenzie Mountains, Kluane and Saint Elias Mountains ranges.

== Behavior ==
Like other thinhorn sheep, Dall sheep live in mountains. Because they do not have long legs or large feet, they cannot move easily in deep snow. They prefer places where the wind scours the snow away before it can accumulate in drifts. Dall sheep climb onto rocks to escape predators. They follow the same paths from summer places to winter places for generations.

Dall sheep live in herds. Adult rams live together in bachelor herds, and the ewes and young sheep live in other herds. Male sheep leave the female herds when they are two or three years old.

The sheep mate in November. Although younger rams can mate, it is principally the older rams who actually sire offspring.

Before an ewe gives birth, she climbs to a rocky, inaccessible site called a "lambing cliff." She and her lamb stay there for a few days. The lamb can eat grass by October.

== Predators ==
Golden eagles, wolves, grizzly bears, and wolverines prey on thinhorn sheep.

== History ==
Thinhorn sheep and snow sheep became two separate species around the time the last ice age ended, 10,000 to 18,000 years ago. After that, the thinhorn sheep moved east and spread out. The Dall sheep and stone sheep became separate subspecies some time after that.
