= Zoltán Szalkai =

Hungarian documentary film director (born 1961)

Zoltán Szalkai (born 1961) is a Hungarian documentary film director. He studied agriculture and geology before turning to a career in directing documentary films.

One of the best known of these is On Foot through Gulag Land, an 8-part film series made on location in Russia. The film explores the many encounters Szalkai had when walking across Russia, as he met people who had been held in the forced labour camps and discussed their experiences with them. He was born and grew up in Hungary when it was dominated by the Soviet Union, and he was taught the Communist version of history.

Szalkai has also filmed in Vietnam and Indonesia. He filmed in Alaska, where he shot Wise Men of Alaska (2000) in the village of Wiseman. This was inspired by the American Robert Marshall's book Arctic Village (1933).

== See also ==
- Gulag
- Kolyma
