= Dietrich River =

River in Alaska, United States

- View from Dalton Highway to Dietrich River right above the mouth of Nutirwik Creek

- Location in Alaska

Physical characteristics
- Source
  - coordinates: 68.1222222°N 149.7052778°W
- Mouth
  - location: Bettles River and Middle Fork Koyukuk River
  - coordinates: 67.6425000°N 149.7419444°W
  - elevation: 433 meters (1,421 ft)
- Length: 35 miles (56 km)

Basin features
- River system: Yukon River

The Dietrich River is a 35 miles (56 km) long braided river in the Yukon-Koyukuk Census Area of Alaska. The headwaters originate in the Brooks Range. It flows south to join the Bettles River and to form the Middle Fork Koyukuk River.

The river forms a broad floodplain. Common species of fish found in the river include Arctic grayling, burbot, Dolly Varden trout, and whitefish.

The Dalton Highway ascends the Dietrich River valley and follows the river for 25 miles.
