= Wiseman, Alaska =

- CDP
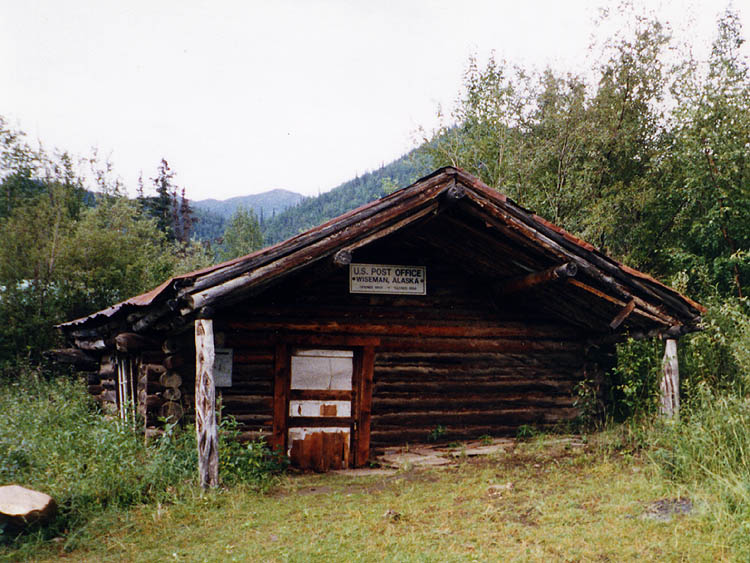
- The log-built post office at Wiseman, seen here in 1995, has been sinking into the ground for the past century, and is now a couple of feet below ground.

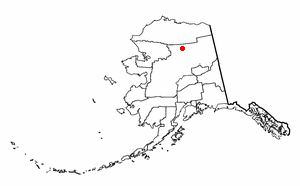
- Location of Wiseman, Alaska
- Coordinates: 67°24′34″N 150°6′35″W
- Country: United States
- State: Alaska
- Census Area: Yukon-Koyukuk

Government
  - State senator: Click Bishop (R)
  - State rep.: Mike Cronk (R)

Area
  - Total: 78.04 sq mi (202.11 km^{2})
  - Land: 78.01 sq mi (202.05 km^{2})
  - Water: 0.019 sq mi (0.05 km^{2})
- Elevation: 1,180 ft (360 m)

Population (2020)
  - Total: 5
  - Density: 0.052/sq mi (0.02/km^{2})
- Time zone: UTC-9 (Alaska (AKST))
  - Summer (DST): UTC-8 (AKDT)
- ZIP code: 99726
- Area code: 907
- FIPS code: 02-85610
- GNIS feature ID: 1414284

Wiseman is a census-designated place (CDP) in Yukon-Koyukuk Census Area, Alaska, United States. The full time resident population is 12 as of 2022.

Wiseman is a small mining community along the Middle Fork Koyukuk River in the Brooks Range. It was founded by gold miners who abandoned the Slate Creek (later Coldfoot) settlement around 1908. Another small mining village (Nolan, on Nolan creek - to the north) survived into the 1970s.

Robert Marshall, who became a prominent American forester, preservation activist, and a co-founder of The Wilderness Society, wrote the bestselling book, Arctic Village, about his 15-month stay in this frontier town around the year 1930. Marshall described Wiseman and the Koyukuk River area surrounding it, as "the happiest civilization of which I have knowledge." Marshall called Noel Wien's first flight there on May 5, 1925, "one of the great events in Koyukuk history."

The community is 3 miles (5 km) from the Dalton Highway, and it was not connected to the road until the early 1990s.

== Geography ==
Wiseman is located at 67°26′0″N 150°5′40″W (67.433355, -150.094376).

According to the United States Census Bureau, the CDP has a total area of 78.1 square miles (202 km^{2}), of which, 78.1 square miles (202 km^{2}) of it is land and 0.04 square miles (0.10 km^{2}) of it (0.05%) is water. The town is bisected by Wiseman Creek.

== Climate ==
Wiseman has a subarctic climate (Köppen Dfc). Summers are short and mild, with frequent rainy days and cool nights. Winters are long and severely cold. Annual snowfall averages 82 inches (208 cm) with a maximum monthly snowfall of 18.2 inches (46 cm) occurring during the month of February.

Climate data for Wiseman, Alaska, 1991–2020 normals, extremes 1918–present
Month	Jan	Feb	Mar	Apr	May	Jun	Jul	Aug	Sep	Oct	Nov	Dec	Year
Record high °F (°C)	36 (2)	40 (4)	49 (9)	68 (20)	81 (27)	88 (31)	90 (32)	86 (30)	72 (22)	56 (13)	38 (3)	36 (2)	90 (32)
Mean maximum °F (°C)	21.4 (−5.9)	29.0 (−1.7)	34.3 (1.3)	52.5 (11.4)	72.3 (22.4)	80.5 (26.9)	81.7 (27.6)	75.1 (23.9)	61.6 (16.4)	42.7 (5.9)	26.4 (−3.1)	24.2 (−4.3)	83.0 (28.3)
Mean daily maximum °F (°C)	−0.5 (−18.1)	5.8 (−14.6)	18.6 (−7.4)	37.6 (3.1)	56.0 (13.3)	70.0 (21.1)	69.8 (21.0)	62.0 (16.7)	48.7 (9.3)	27.6 (−2.4)	6.9 (−13.9)	3.4 (−15.9)	33.8 (1.0)
Daily mean °F (°C)	−9.9 (−23.3)	−4.8 (−20.4)	4.0 (−15.6)	24.1 (−4.4)	42.7 (5.9)	56.6 (13.7)	57.5 (14.2)	50.6 (10.3)	38.6 (3.7)	19.0 (−7.2)	−1.6 (−18.7)	−6.0 (−21.1)	22.6 (−5.2)
Mean daily minimum °F (°C)	−19.3 (−28.5)	−15.5 (−26.4)	−10.6 (−23.7)	10.6 (−11.9)	29.3 (−1.5)	43.2 (6.2)	45.1 (7.3)	39.3 (4.1)	28.6 (−1.9)	10.4 (−12.0)	−10.2 (−23.4)	−15.4 (−26.3)	11.3 (−11.5)
Mean minimum °F (°C)	−49.8 (−45.4)	−43.0 (−41.7)	−34.2 (−36.8)	−16.6 (−27.0)	11.1 (−11.6)	32.8 (0.4)	34.4 (1.3)	26.3 (−3.2)	14.7 (−9.6)	−10.7 (−23.7)	−27.0 (−32.8)	−41.3 (−40.7)	−52.8 (−47.1)
Record low °F (°C)	−65 (−54)	−65 (−54)	−58 (−50)	−39 (−39)	−10 (−23)	20 (−7)	25 (−4)	13 (−11)	−2 (−19)	−35 (−37)	−50 (−46)	−58 (−50)	−65 (−54)
Average precipitation inches (mm)	0.79 (20)	0.95 (24)	0.47 (12)	0.58 (15)	1.06 (27)	1.83 (46)	2.71 (69)	2.74 (70)	1.89 (48)	1.12 (28)	0.87 (22)	0.93 (24)	15.94 (405)
Average snowfall inches (cm)	16.2 (41)	18.2 (46)	4.4 (11)	5.6 (14)	0.6 (1.5)	0.0 (0.0)	0.0 (0.0)	0.0 (0.0)	3.3 (8.4)	9.2 (23)	11.2 (28)	13.3 (34)	82.0 (208)
Average precipitation days (≥ 0.01 in)	6.9	9.2	3.1	6.3	6.3	11.4	14.4	13.6	12.2	8.8	7.4	8.9	108.5
Average snowy days (≥ 0.1 in)	7.8	10.3	4.3	3.7	0.5	0.0	0.0	0.0	1.7	7.7	8.6	9.1	53.8
Source: NOAA

== Demographics ==
Historical population
Census	Pop.	Note	%±
1930	58		—
1940	53		−8.6%
1990	33		—
2000	21		−36.4%
2010	14		−33.3%
2020	5		−64.3%
U.S. Decennial Census

Wiseman first appeared on the 1930 U.S. Census as an unincorporated village. It returned again in 1940. It did not appear again until the 1990 census when it was designated an Alaskan Native Village Statistical Area (ANVSA), although most of the residents were non-Native. In 2000, it was made a census-designated place (CDP).

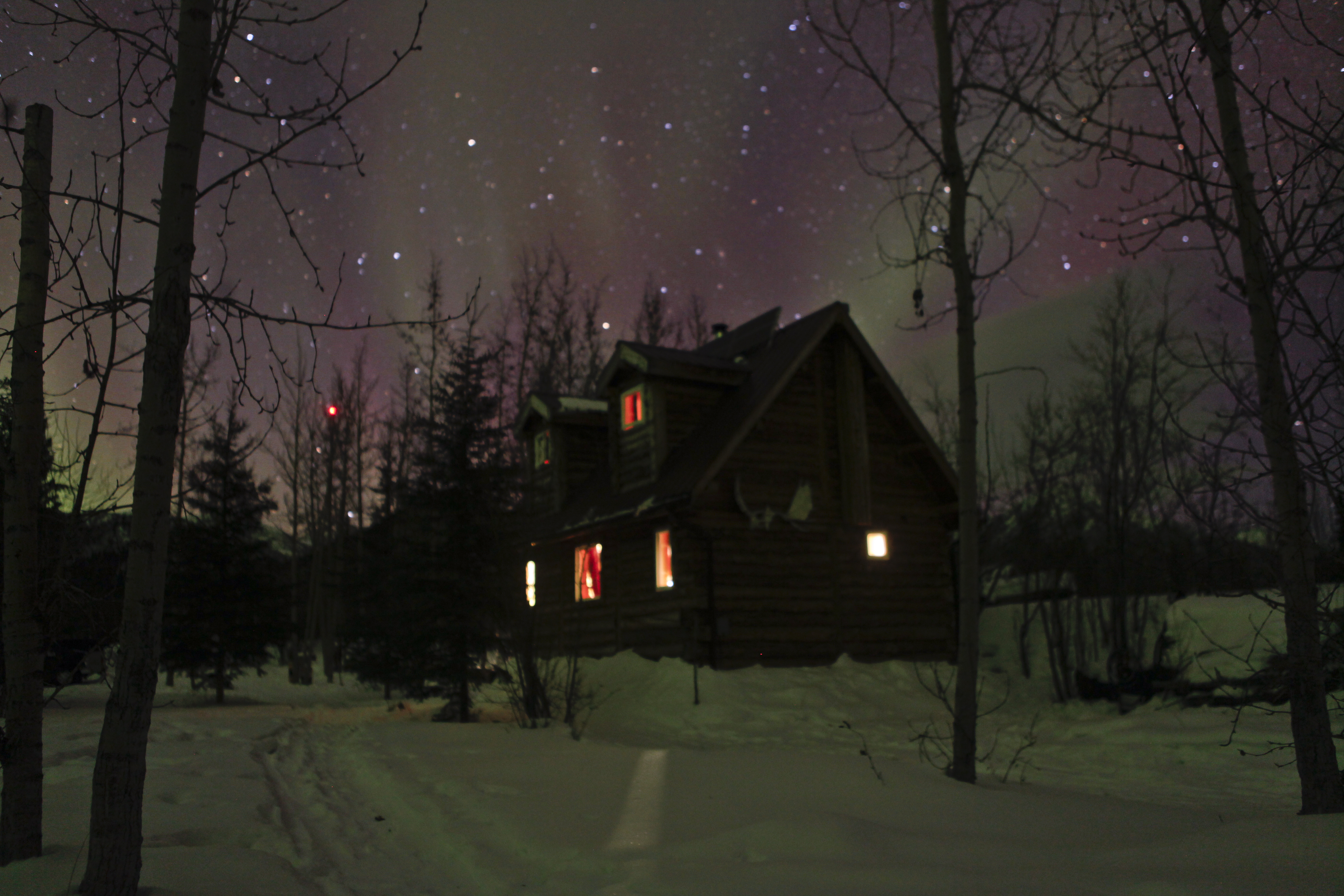
House in Wiseman

As of the census of 2000, there were 21 people, 7 households, and 3 families residing in the CDP. The population density was 0.3 inhabitants per square mile (0.12/km^{2}). There were 30 housing units at an average density of 0.4 per square mile (0.15/km^{2}). The racial makeup of the CDP was 81% White, and 19% Native American.

There were 7 households, out of which 4 (60%) had children under the age of 18 living with them, 4 (60%) were married couples living together, and 3 (40%) were non-families. 3 (40%) of all households were made up of individuals, and none (0%) had someone living alone who was 65 years of age or older. The average household size was 3.0 and the average family size was 4.5.

In the CDP, the population was spread out, with 8 (40%) under the age of 18, 2 (10%) from 18 to 24, 9 (40%) from 25 to 44, 2 (10%) from 45 to 64, and none (0%) aged 65 and over. The median age was 34 years. For every 100 females, there were 130 males. [9 females, 12 males]. For every 100 females age 18 and over, there were 160 males. [5 females, 8 males].

The median income for a household in the CDP was $23,750, and the median income for a family was $24,583. Males had a median income of $0 versus $11,250 for females. The per capita income for the CDP was $8,211. There were no families and 10% of the population living below the poverty line, including no under eighteens and none of those over 64.

== Education ==
The community was previously served by a school of the Yukon–Koyukuk School District.

== Films ==
- Zoltan Szalkai produced a film entitled Wise Men of Alaska (2000), shot in Wiseman village.
- Gates of the Arctic: Alaska's Brooks Range (2007)
- Life Below Zero features Wiseman
