= Gregg Ritz =

American professional hunter

Gregg Ritz is a professional adventure hunter who lives in New Hampshire, United States. He specializes in technical muzzleloading and archery, and is known for his appearances on the Outdoor Channel's television show Hunt Masters. Ritz is the President of WildComm, an outdoor marketing and media company.

== History ==
A native of Maryland, United States, Ritz hunted through the backwoods of his hometown as a boy. By the age of 12, he had begun to notch his first few archery kills with whitetails, waterfowl, and other small game. He soon began to develop his skills as a competitive trap shooter and muzzleloader, earning attention for his skill in hunting by the age of 16. He attended Ohio Wesleyan University, where he earned a bachelor's degree in English and Economics Management. Sticking to his passion for hunting, Ritz formed his university's first trap shooting team during his undergraduate years.

Ritz was the CEO of Game Trails, a commercial hunting preserve. Game Trails was fined $50,000 (one of the largest wildlife penalties in state history) for numerous misdemeanor violations of the Lacey Act and for making false statements to Kentucky officers.

Ritz continued to become the CEO of Thompson Center Arms, an American firearms company based on Rochester, New Hampshire known for its line of black-powder firearms and interchangeable barrel single-shot pistols and rifles. Following his time at Thompson/Center, Ritz launched Wild Communications.

== Entrepreneurship ==
Wild Communications was founded by Gregg Ritz in 2007, a marketing and media company that represents top celebrity hunters in the outdoor industry. The company focuses on television representation, licensing, endorsements, marketing services, social media, mergers & acquisitions and business consulting.

== Television ==
Ritz is the host and executive producer of the Hunt Masters television show on Outdoor Channel. He also created Gregg Ritz's Primitive Instinct which also aired on the Outdoor Channel.
