= Arctic Village (book) =

1933 book by Robert Marshall

- Author: Robert Marshall
- Language: English
- Publisher: H. Smith and R. Haas
- Publication date: 1933
- Dewey Decimal: 917.98
- LC Class: F909 .M37

Arctic Village (1933) is a book written by Robert Marshall, an American forester, writer, and wilderness activist (1901-1939), about the Koyukuk River area and the town of Wiseman. He lived there for 15 months starting in 1930 while conducting research on tree growth near the Arctic Divide. Marshall referred to the people of the frontier village as "...the happiest civilization of which I have knowledge."

Of incidental note, Arctic Village, a best-seller of its day, was carried by famed humorist Will Rogers on his trip with famed aviator Wiley Post to Alaska in 1935; tragically their plane crashed near Point Barrow, killing both men. See John Evangelist Walsh, When the Laughing Stopped: the Strange, Sad Death of Will Rogers (University of Alaska Press, 2008), pp. 29 and 30 et passim.
