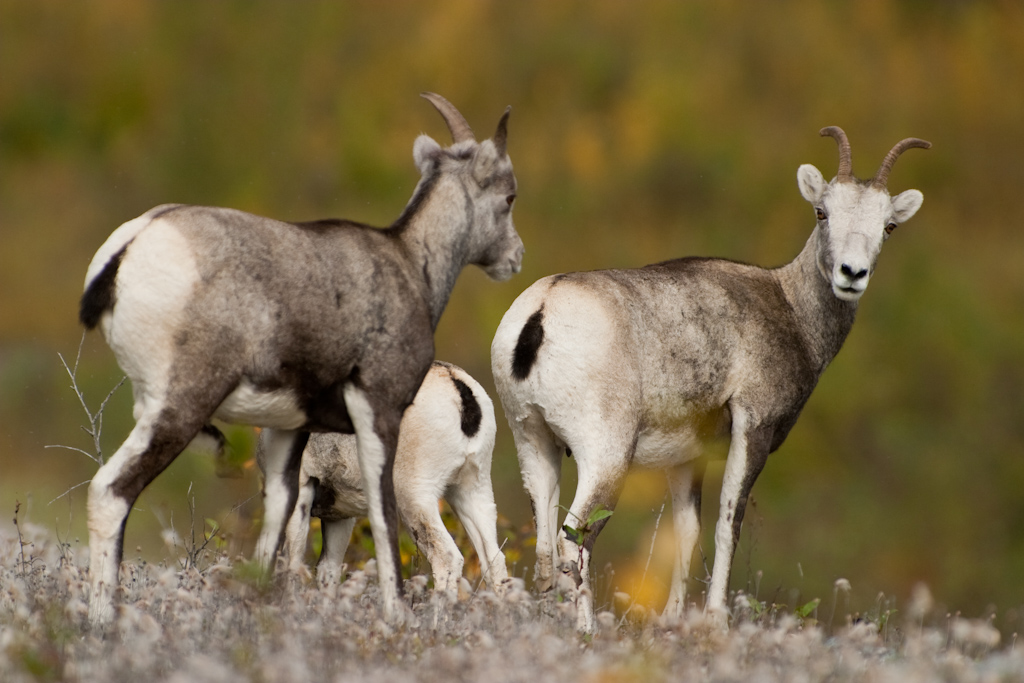

Scientific classification
- Kingdom: Animalia
- Phylum: Chordata
- Class: Mammalia
- Order: Artiodactyla
- Family: Bovidae
- Subfamily: Caprinae
- Genus: Ovis
- Species: O. dalli
- Subspecies: O. d. stonei

Trinomial name
- Ovis dalli stonei J. A. Allen, 1897

= Stone sheep =

Type of caprine

The Stone's sheep (Ovis dalli stonei) or stone sheep is the more southern subspecies of thinhorn sheep, Ovis dalli.

== Distribution ==
The global population of Stone's sheep is primarily found in Northern British Columbia and can often be seen licking minerals along the side of the Alaska Highway in areas such as Summit Lake, Stone Mountain Provincial Park, and Muncho Lake Provincial Park.

== Description ==
Pelage colour variations range widely, from slate grey-brown with a white rump patch, dark tail and white on the inside of the hind legs, to an almost completely white/grey-white coat with a dark or black dorsal surface on the tail. Horns are curved in form and vary in colour from a yellowish-brown to dark brown horns.
