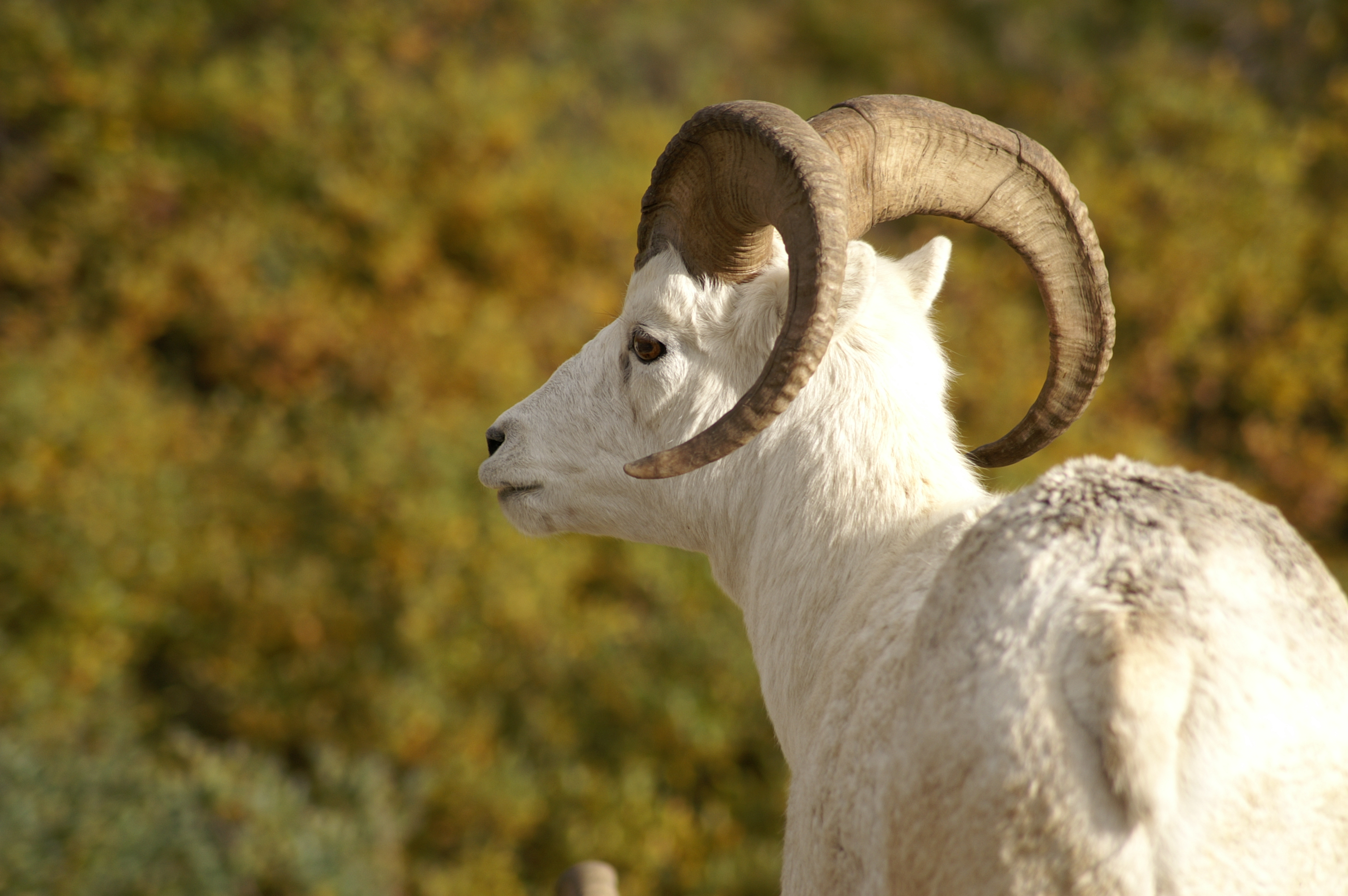
- Ram
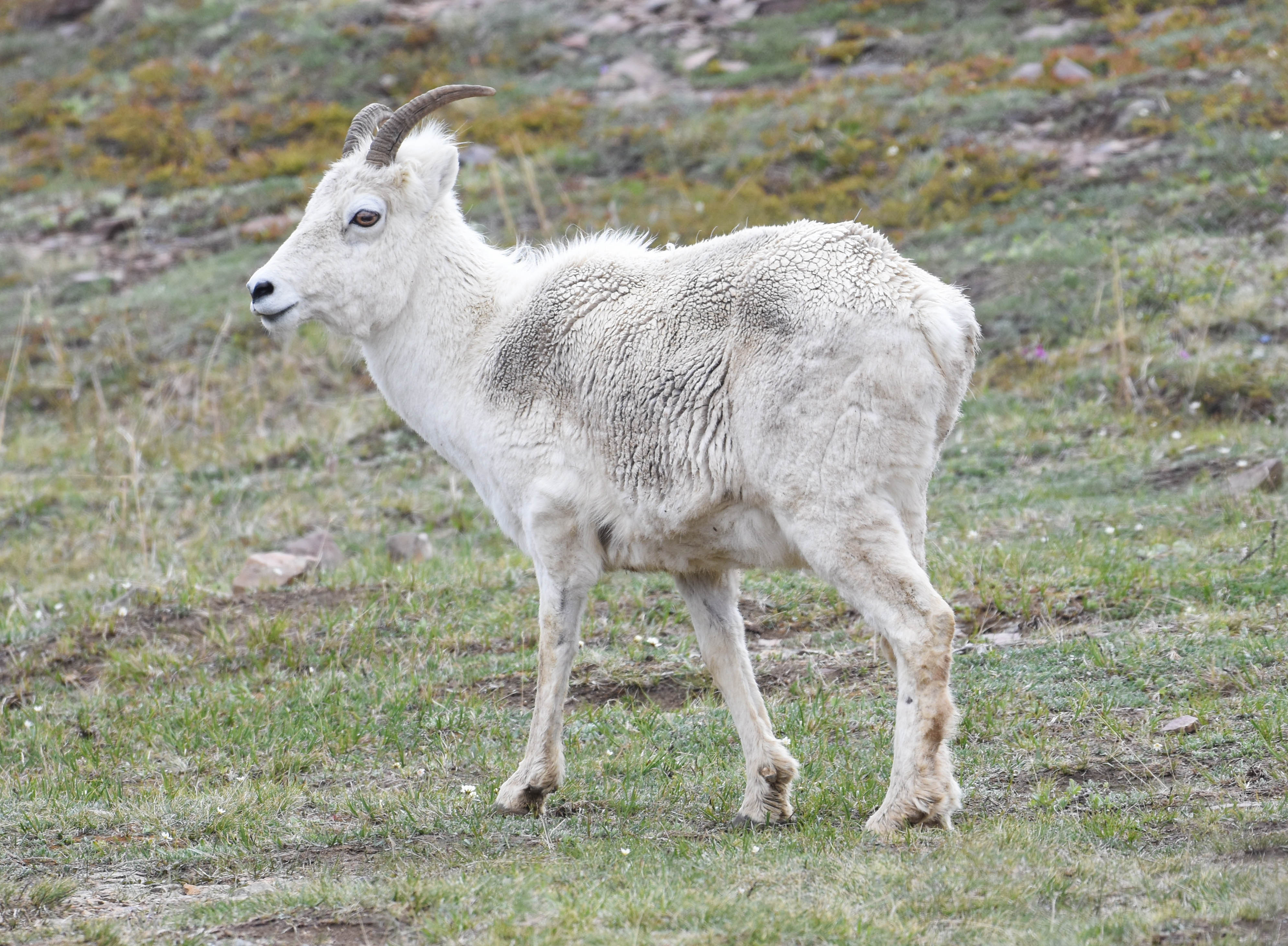
- ewe both in Denali National Park in Alaska

Conservation status
- Least Concern (IUCN 3.1)

Scientific classification
- Kingdom: Animalia
- Phylum: Chordata
- Class: Mammalia
- Order: Artiodactyla
- Family: Bovidae
- Subfamily: Caprinae
- Genus: Ovis
- Species: O. dalli

Binomial name
- Ovis dalli Nelson, 1884

Subspecies
- O. d. dalli; O. d. stonei
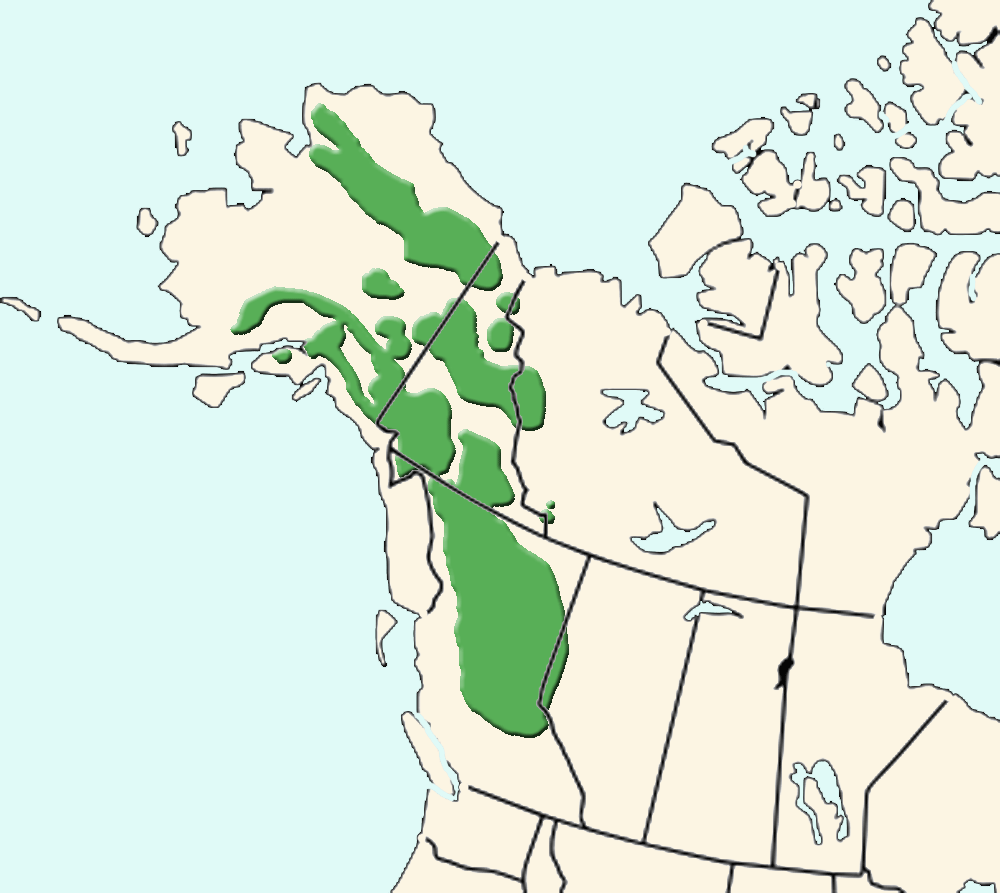

= Dall sheep =

Ovis dalli

Species of mammal

Dall sheep or thinhorn sheep (Ovis dalli), is a species of wild sheep native to northwestern North America. O. dalli live in mountainous alpine habitats distributed across northwestern British Columbia, the Yukon, Northwest Territories and Alaska. They browse a variety of plants, such as grasses, sedges and even shrubs, such as willow, during different times of the year. They also acquire minerals to supplement their diet from mineral licks. Like other Ovis species, the rams engage in dominance contests with their horns.

== Taxonomy and genetics ==
The specific name dalli, is derived from William Healey Dall (1845–1927), an American naturalist. The common name, Dall's sheep or Dall sheep is often used to refer to the nominate subspecies, O. d. dalli. The other subspecies, O. d. stonei, is called the Stone sheep.

Originally, the subspecies O. d. dalli and O. d. stonei were distinguished by the color of their fur. However, the pelage-based designations have been shown to be questionable. Complete colour intergradation occurs in both O. dalli sheep subspecies (i.e., Dall's and Stone's), ranging between white and dark morphs of the species. Intermediately coloured populations, called Fannin sheep, were originally (incorrectly) identified as a unique subspecies (O. d. fannini) with distributions inhabiting in the Pelly Mountains and Ogilvie Mountains of the Yukon Territory. Fannin sheep have more recently been confirmed as admixed individuals with predominantly Dall's sheep genetic origins. Previous mitochondrial DNA evidence had shown no molecular division along earlier subspecies boundaries, although evidence from nuclear DNA may provide some support. Current taxonomy using mitochondrial DNA information may be less reliable due to hybridization between O. dalli and O. canadensis recorded in evolutionary history.

Current genetics analyses using a genomewide set of single nucleotide polymorphisms (SNPs) has confirmed new subspecies range boundaries for both Dall's and Stone's sheep, updating the previous pelage-based and mitochondrial DNA classifications.

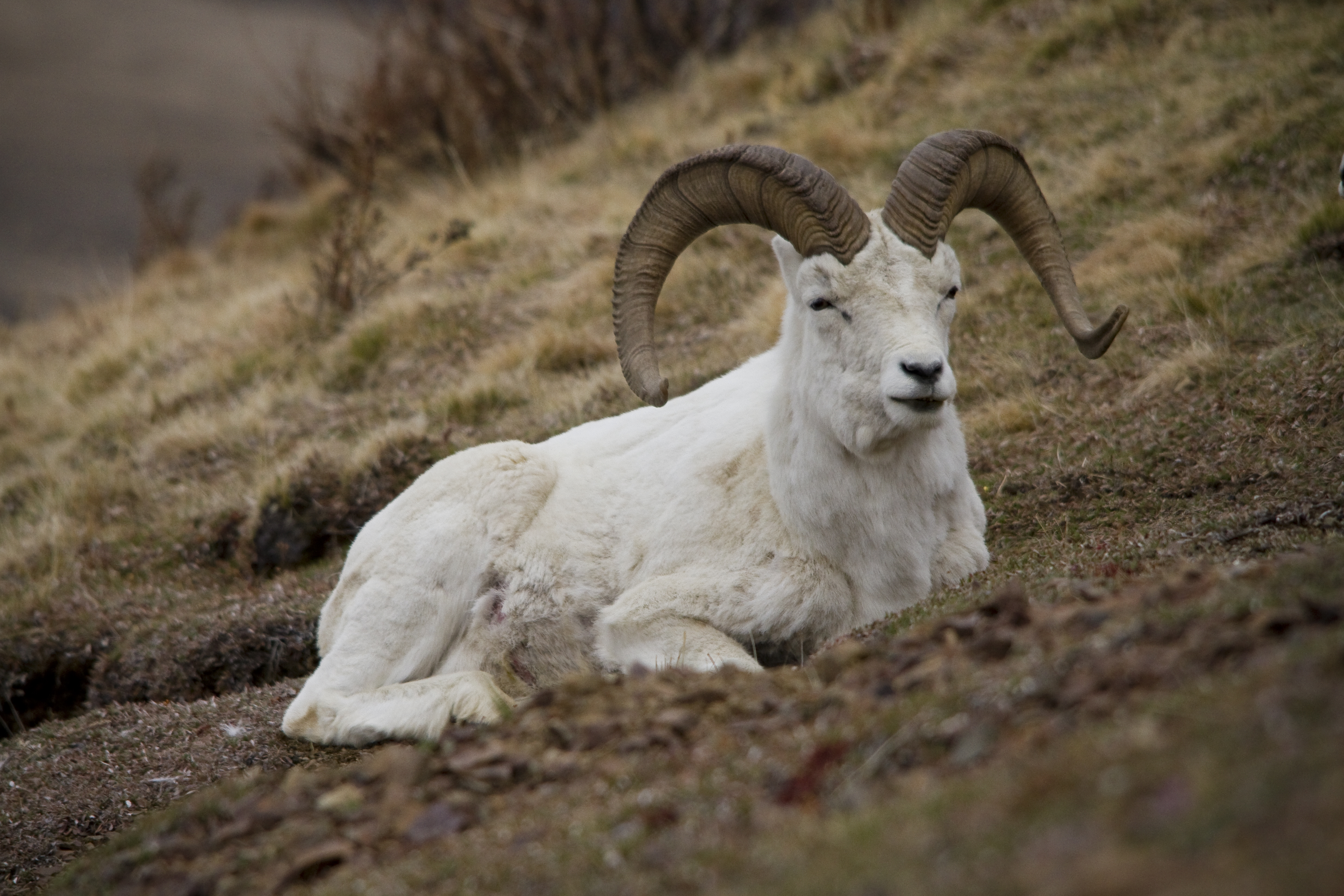
Dall sheep ram (male adult)

== Description ==
O. dalli stand about 3 ft (0.9 m) at the shoulder. They are off-white in color, and their coat consists of a fine wool undercoat and stiff, long, and hollow guard hairs. Their winter coats can be over 2 inches (5 cm) thick. O. dalli can live to be 12 to 16 years of age.

O. dalli are sexually dimorphic, which means rams and ewes look different. Rams are larger than ewes and typically weigh between 160 and 180 pounds (70 and 80 kg) at maturity. Ewes weigh approximately 100 to 110 pounds (45 to 50 kg) on average. During the winter, adult sheep may lose up to 16% of their body mass, and lambs and yearlings as much as 40% depending on winter weather severity. O. dalli begin growing horns at about two months old. Ewes have small, slender horns compared to the massive, curling horns of rams. Young rams resemble ewes until they are about 3 years of age. At this point, their horns begin to grow much faster and larger than ewes' horns.

Adult male O. dalli have thick, curling horns. Adult males are easily distinguished by their horns, which continue to grow steadily from spring to early fall. This results in a start-and-stop growth pattern of rings called annuli. Annuli can be used to help determine age.

== Natural history ==
=== Ecology ===
The sheep inhabit the subarctic and arctic mountain ranges of Alaska, the Yukon Territory, the Mackenzie Mountains in the western Northwest Territories, and central and northern British Columbia. O. dalli are found in areas with a combination of dry alpine tundra, meadows, and steep or rugged ground. This combination allows for both grazing and escape from predators.

O. dalli can often be observed along the Seward Highway South of Anchorage, Alaska, within Denali National Park and Preserve (which was created in 1917 to preserve the sheep from overhunting), at Sheep Mountain in Kluane National Park and Reserve, in the Tatshenshini Park Tatshenshini-Alsek Provincial Park in northwestern British Columbia, and near Faro, Yukon.

Primary predators of this sheep are wolf packs, coyotes, black bears, and grizzly bears; golden eagles are predators of the young. O. dalli have been known to butt gray wolves off the face of cliffs.

=== Social structure ===
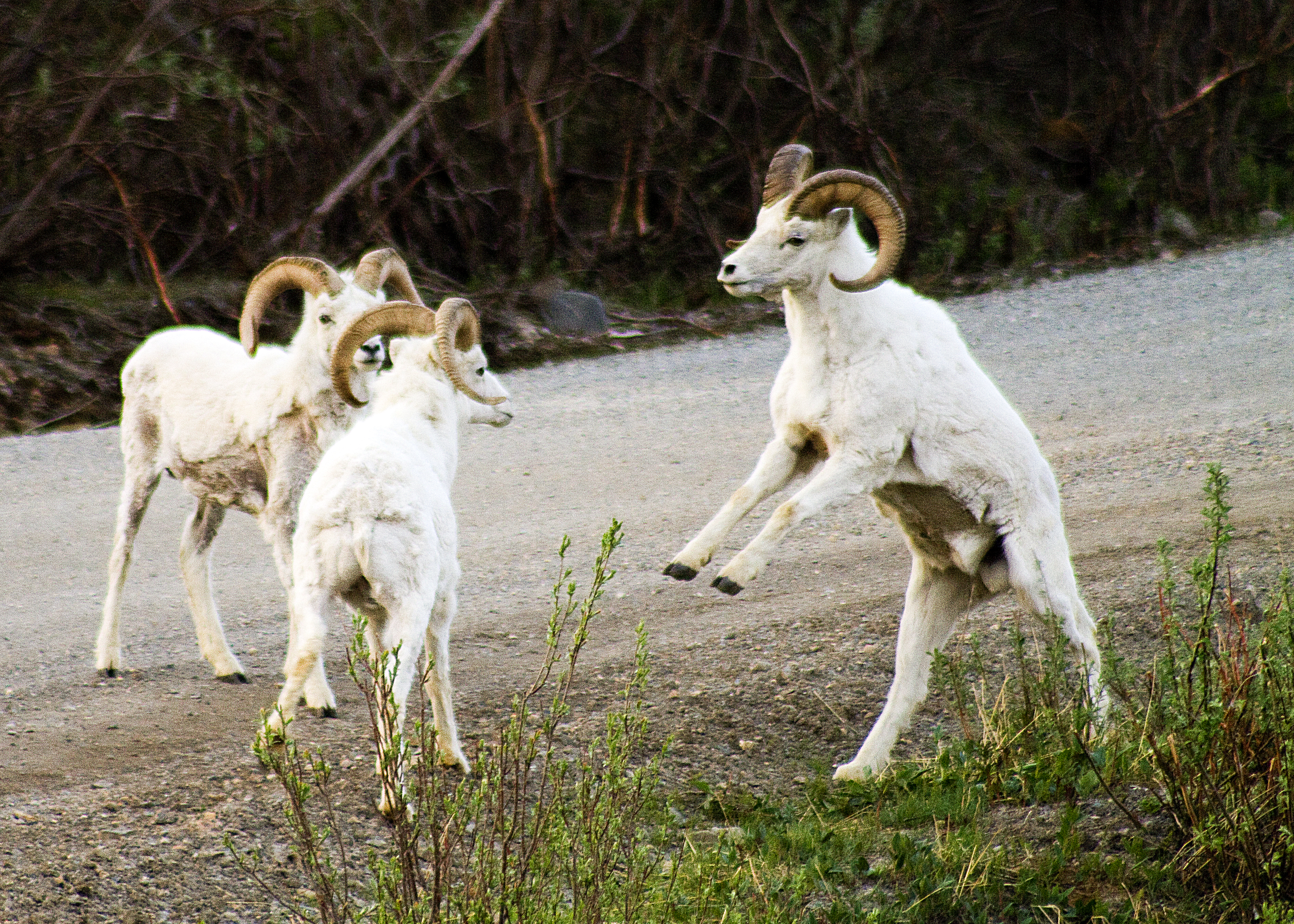
Rams interacting in Denali National Park

Rams and ewes are rarely found in the same groups outside of the mating season, or rut, which occurs from mid-November through mid-December. For most of the year, rams feed in the best foraging areas to enhance their reproductive fitness. During spring and summer, ewes are more likely to select areas such as steep, rocky slopes with lower predation risk to raise offspring.

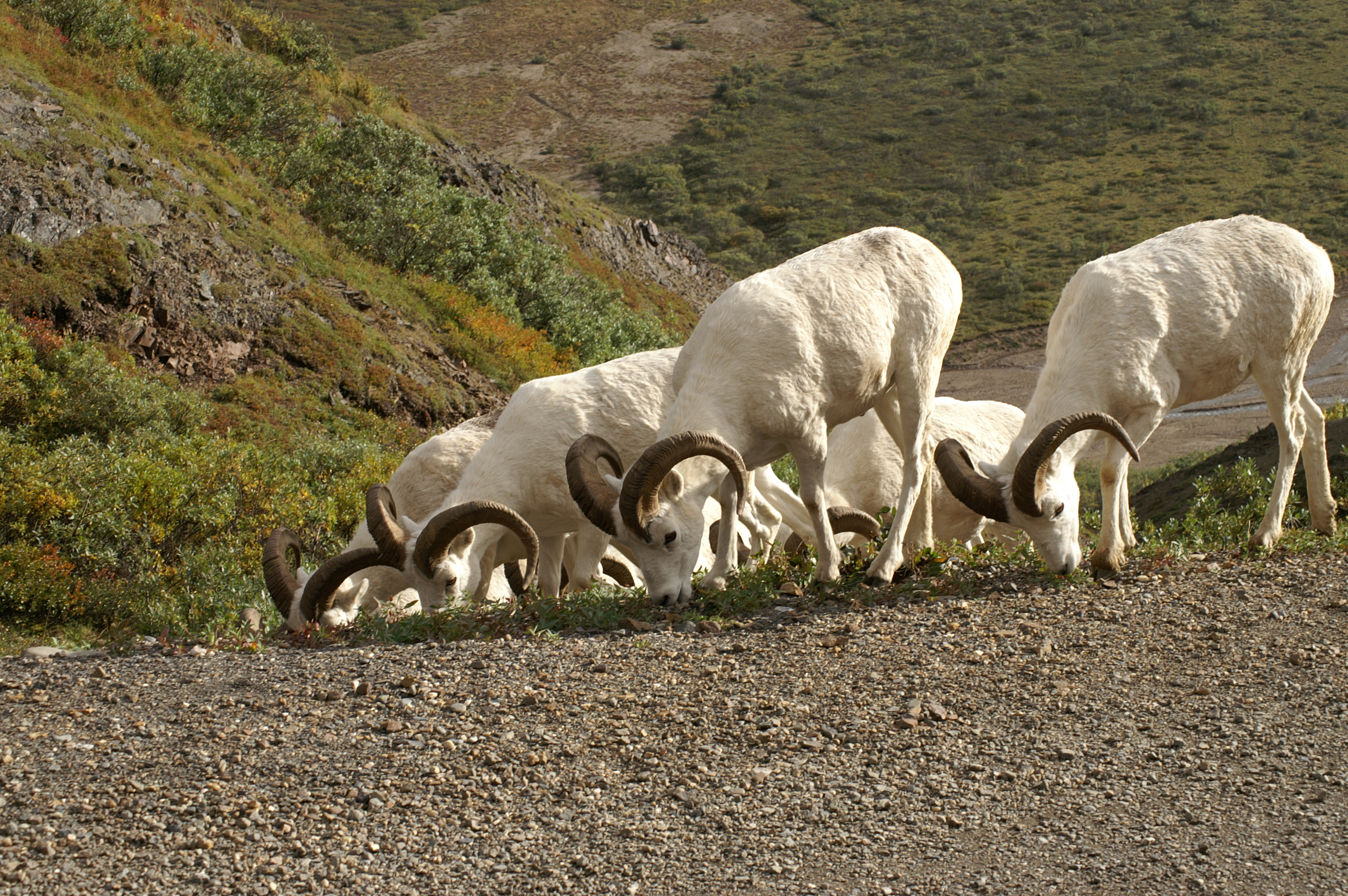
Dall Sheep herd

Social order and dominance rank is maintained in ram groups through a variety of behaviors including head-on collisions. These dramatic clashes involve each ram getting a running start before colliding, horns-first into one another. Other behaviors associated with establishing social order include leg kicks, bluff charges, and dominance mounting. Most of this behavior establishes order year-round, but clashes between males with similar horn sizes intensify as the rut approaches. Ewes occasionally engage in similar competitive behavior over feeding or bedding sites. Young sheep practice such interactions as part of their play. While rams do clash horns, it is done to establish order, not over fights to possess ewes.

Rams are known to occupy up to six seasonal ranges, including different areas used during autumn, rut (or mating season from mid-November to mid-December), midwinter, late winter/spring, and summer, as well as spending time at salt licks.

For most of the year, ewes select areas free of snow and close to forage. After lambs are born in May, close proximity to escape terrain as well as nearby forage are important in habitat selection. Ewes and lambs will travel farther from escape terrain to forage when in larger groups.

In the summer, food has a high variety and is abundant. In the winter, food is limited to what is available in snow-free areas, such as frozen grasses, sedges, lichens, or mosses. O. dalli will travel long distances in the spring to visit mineral licks to supplement their diet.

== Relationship with humans ==
=== Hunting ===
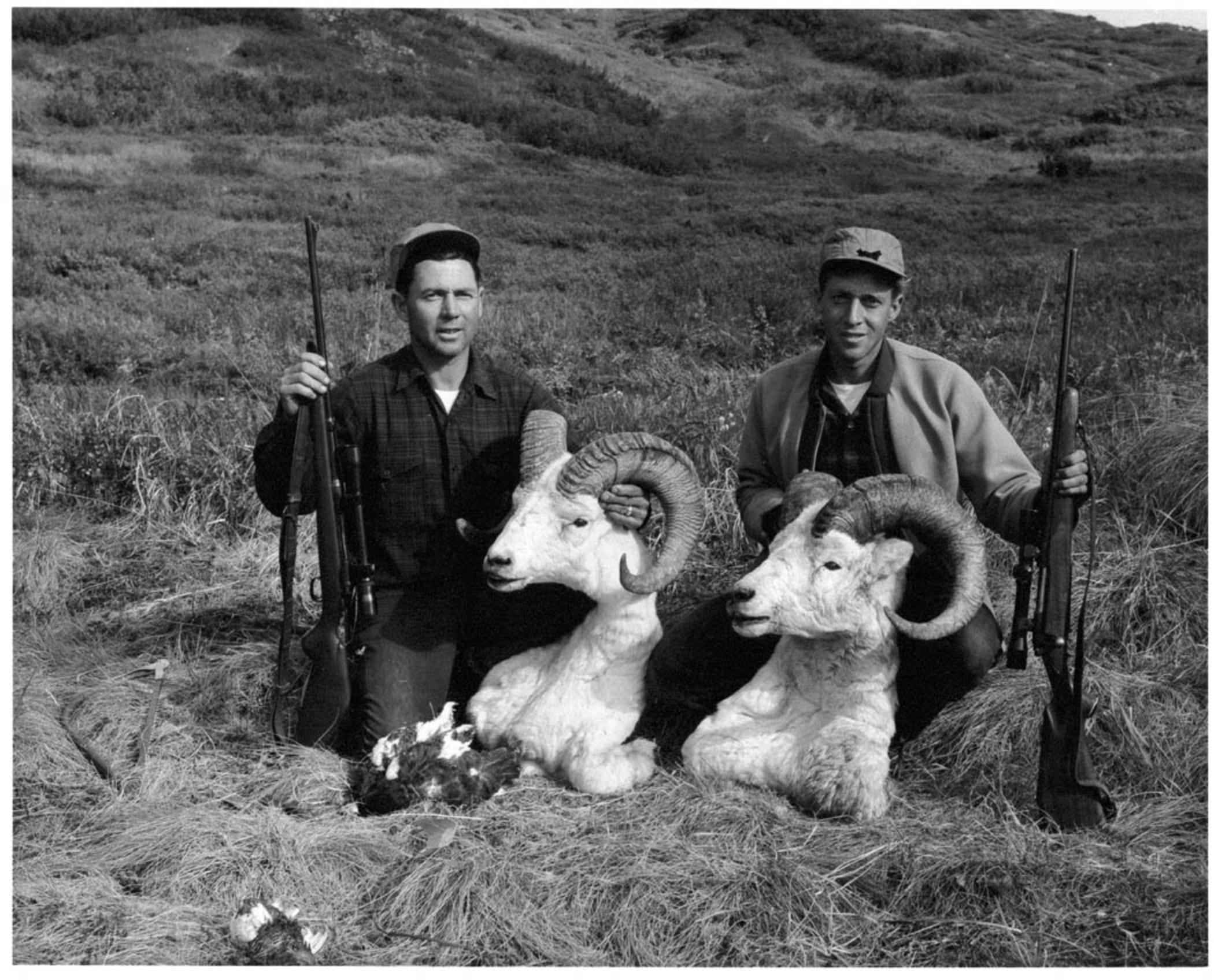
Sport hunting of O. dalli, 1953

The Inupiat people have a long history of hunting O. dalli that dates back to at least the 16th century. Sheep are valued for their skin, which is used for warm clothing, and their meat, especially in times when caribou are not available. Historically, the sheep were hunted in summer by foot and in winter by dog sled teams. Today, the rugged terrain in which they live still requires foot travel to reach these animals. The dependence on O. dalli for meat and clothing fluctuates with caribou populations. Caribou herds declined considerably in the 1940s, and O. dalli became an important harvest species. Since the 1990s, caribou populations have been large enough to sustain people. Consequently, subsistence harvest of O. dalli is lower now than in the 1940s, but sheep continue to be an important meat source when caribou migration routes shift during the winter or between years.

Where sport hunting is allowed in Alaska's national preserves, hunters can harvest mature O. dalli rams that have horns that are full-curl or greater, have both tips broken off or are eight years of age or older.

=== Climate change ===
Changes in O. dalli abundance, distribution, composition and health may indicate changes happening with other species and ecosystem processes. The sheep live in alpine, or high mountain, areas. These areas are expected to experience significant changes associated with climate change. Changes may include shifts in locations of plant communities (e.g., an increase in shrubs in alpine areas), diversity of plant species (e.g., loss of important forage species for sheep), and local weather patterns (such as increased incidence of high winter snowfall and icing events), which may affect sheep distribution and abundance.

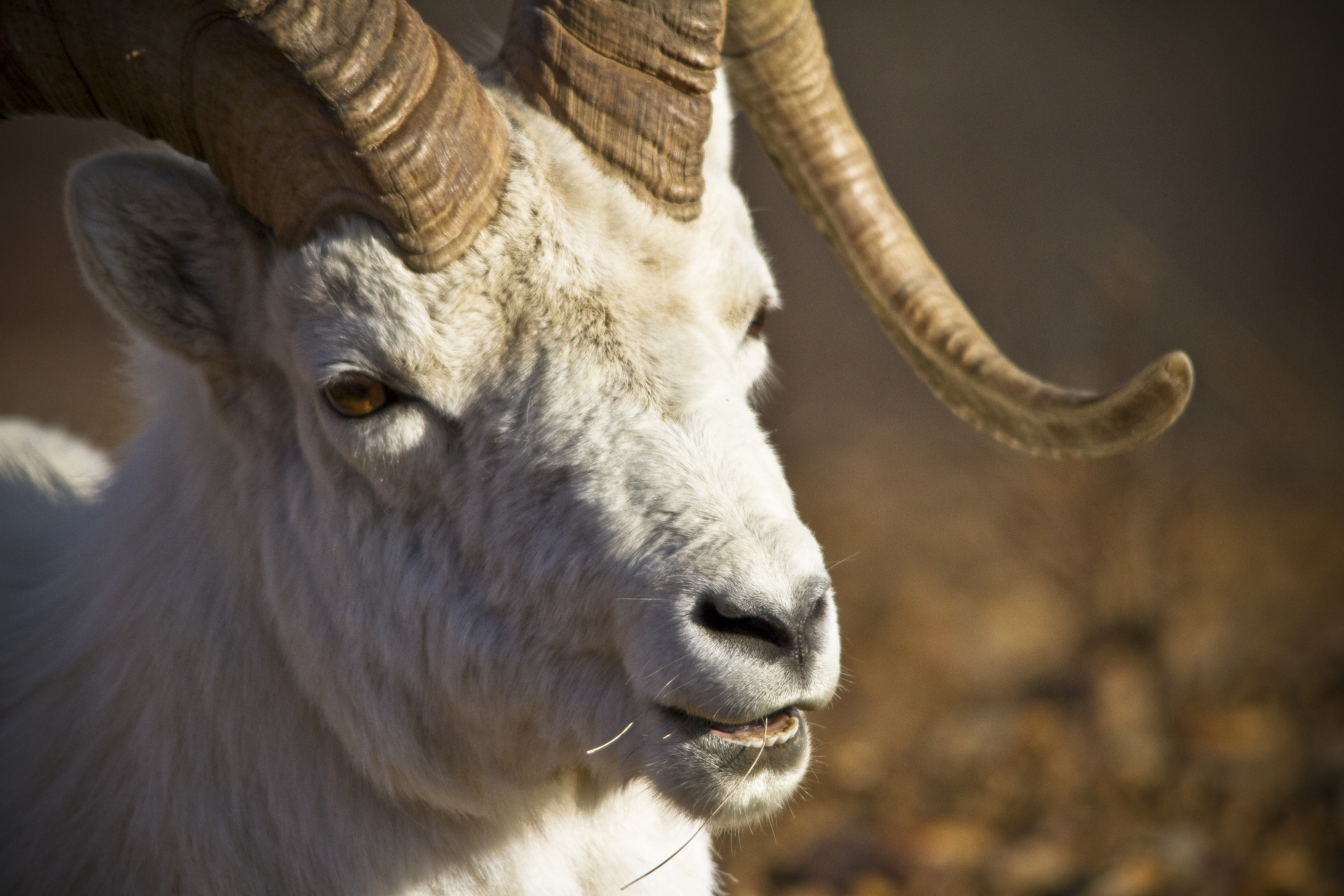
O. dalli ram eating grass

Some species are expected to benefit from climate change while others will not. Shrubs and woody plants typically dominate plant communities at lower elevations. As elevation increases, the dominant plant community transitions to one dominated by low-growing grasses, flowers, and lichens. Warming climate trends, longer growing seasons, and changes in precipitation have the potential to allow woody plant species to find suitable habitat at higher elevations.

As a result, low-growing alpine species may be out-competed or shaded by the encroaching woody plants. Changes in the seasonal availability and diversity of alpine plants may affect O. dalli populations by altering sheep diets and consequently where they can live in mountain parks, as well as ewe pregnancy rates and lamb growth and survival.

== Sources and further reading ==
- Banfield, AWF (1974). The Mammals of Canada. University of Toronto Press. ISBN 0-8020-2137-9.
- Corti, P; Shackleton, DM (2002). "Relationship between predation-risk factors and sexual segregation of Dall's sheep (Ovis dalli dalli)". Canadian Journal of Zoology. 80 (12): 2108–211. Bibcode:2002CaJZ...80.2108C. doi:10.1139/z02-207.
- Jex, BA; Ayotte, JB; Bleich, VC; Brewer, CE; et al. (2016). "Thinhorn sheep: conservation challenges and management strategies for the 21st Century". Boise, Idaho, USA: Wild Sheep Working Group, Western Association of Fish and Wildlife Agencies.
- Nichols, L; Bunnell, FL (1999). "Natural history of thinhorn sheep". In Valdez, R; Krausman, PR (eds.). Mountain sheep of North America. Tucson, Arizona: The University of Arizona Press. pp. 23–77.
- "Ovis dalli". North American Mammals. Smithsonian Institution. Archived from the original on 25 June 2018.
