= Sukakpak Mountain =

Mountain in the Brooks Range, Alaska, United States

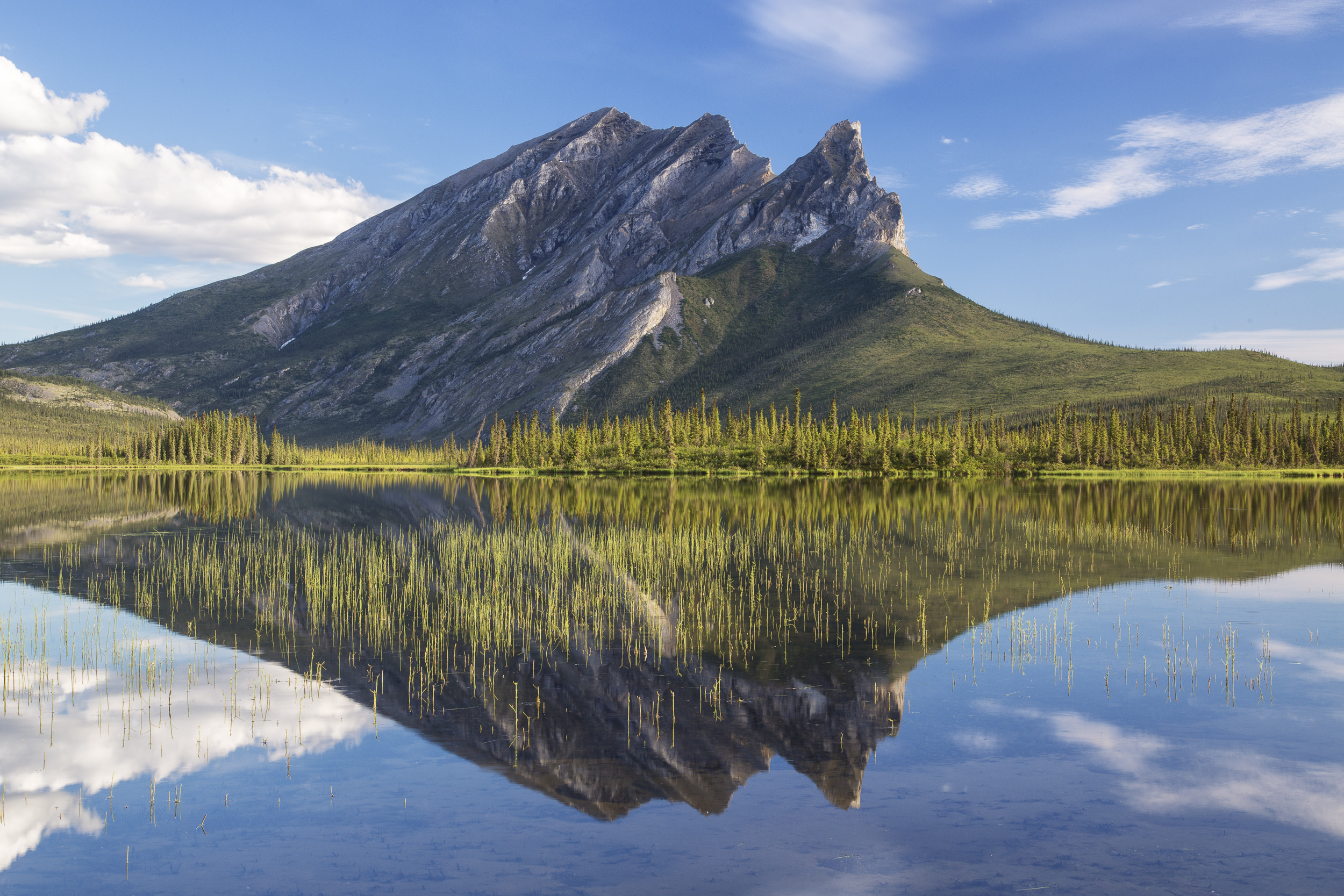
- Sukakpak Mountain, north aspect

Highest point
- Elevation: 4,459 ft (1,359 m)
- Prominence: 1,883 ft (574 m)
- Parent peak: Dillon Mountain (4,820 ft)
- Isolation: 3.3 mi (5.3 km)
- Coordinates: 67°36′12″N 149°44′31″W

Geography
- Location within Alaska
- Interactive map of Sukakpak Mountain
- Location: Yukon–Koyukuk; Alaska, United States
- Parent range: Philip Smith Mountains; Brooks Range
- Topo map: USGS Chandalar C-6

Geology
- Rock age: Devonian
- Rock type(s): limestone, marble

Climbing
- Easiest route: Scrambling south ridge

Sukakpak Mountain is a prominent 4,459-foot (1,359 meter) mountain summit located in the Philip Smith Mountains of the Brooks Range, in the U.S. state of Alaska. The peak is situated 90 miles north of the Arctic Circle near milepost 203 on the Dalton Highway, and 200 mi (322 km) north-northwest of Fairbanks, where the Bettles and Dietrich Rivers merge to form Middle Fork Koyukuk River. The peak's Sukakpak name was reported in 1930 by the USGS as an Inupiat word, said to mean "marten deadfall." From the north, the mountain resembles a carefully balanced log used to trap marten. The name was officially adopted in 1932 by the U.S. Board on Geographic Names.

This famous landmark is notable for its west face, a massive wall of Skajit limestone rising nearly 3,000 feet (900 m) above the surrounding valley. Peculiar ice-cored mounds known as palsas punctuate the ground at the base of the mountain. Sukakpak Mountain was designated in 1990 as a BLM Area of Critical Environmental Concern to protect this extraordinary scenic and geologic formation.

== Climate ==
Based on the Köppen climate classification, Sukakpak Mountain is located in a subarctic climate zone with long, cold, winters, and short, cool summers. Winter temperatures can drop below −30 °C (−22 °F) with wind chill factors below −50 °C (−58 °F). The months June through August offer the most favorable weather for viewing and climbing.

== Gallery ==
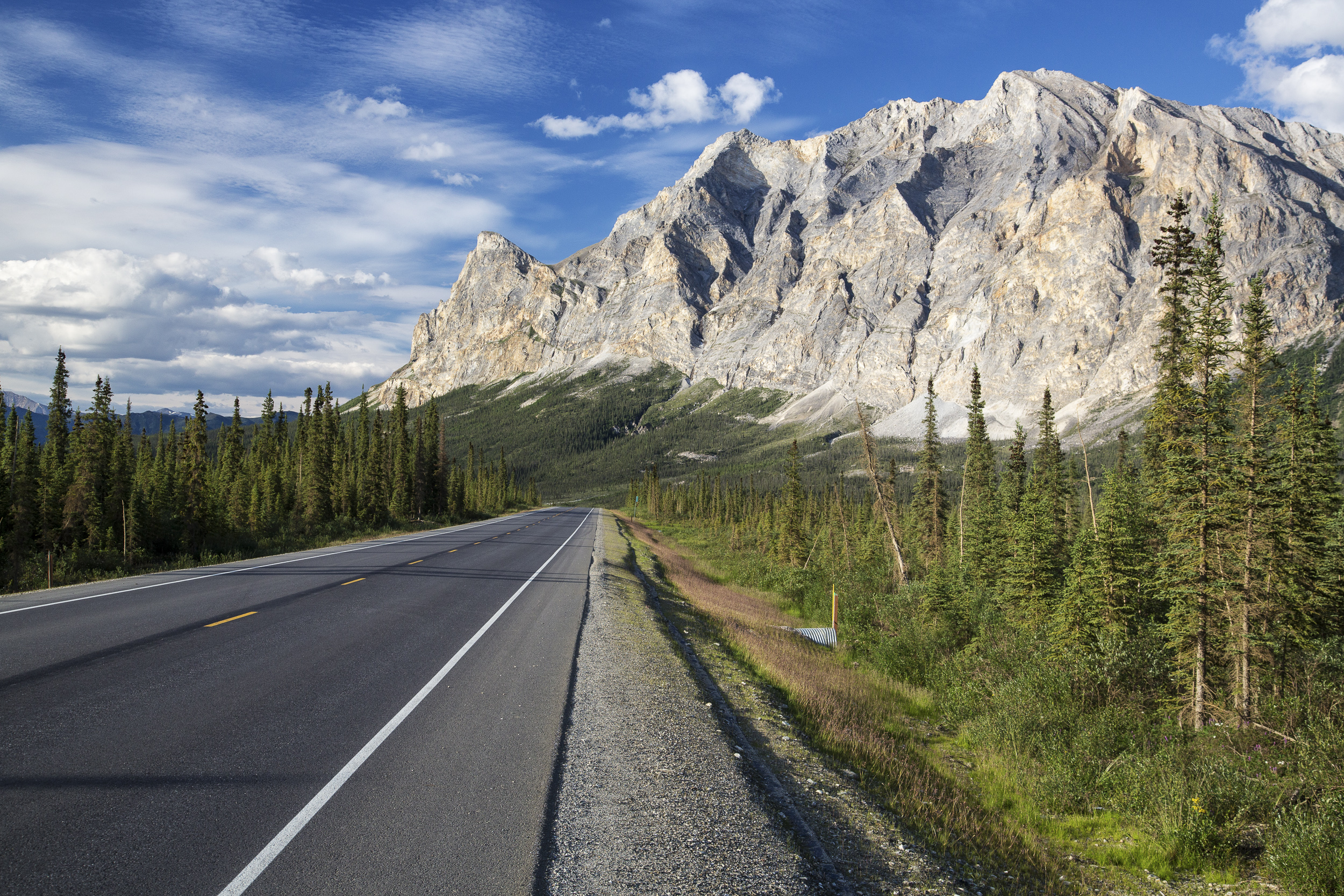
Sukakpak from northbound Dalton Highway

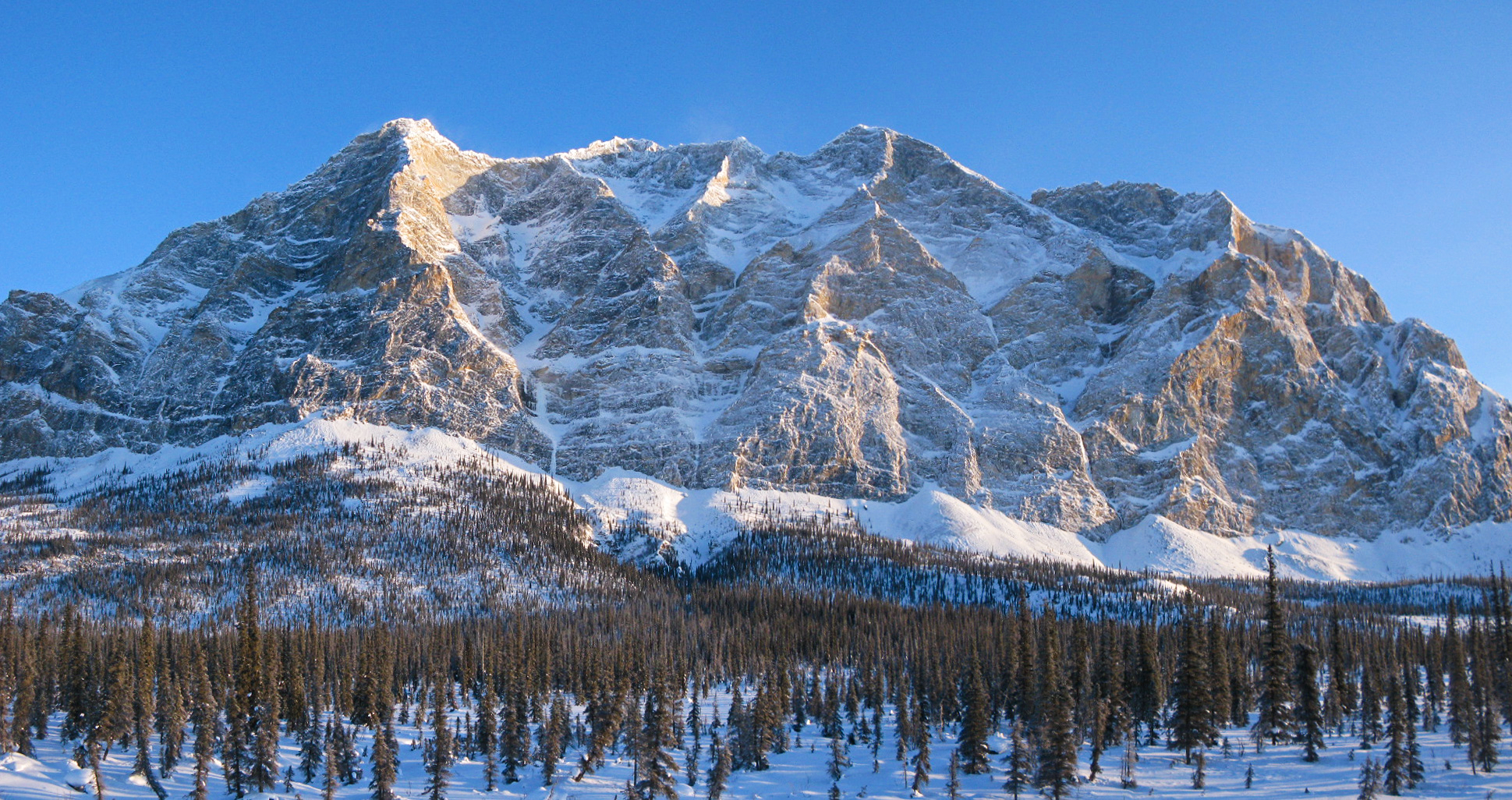
Sukakpak's west face

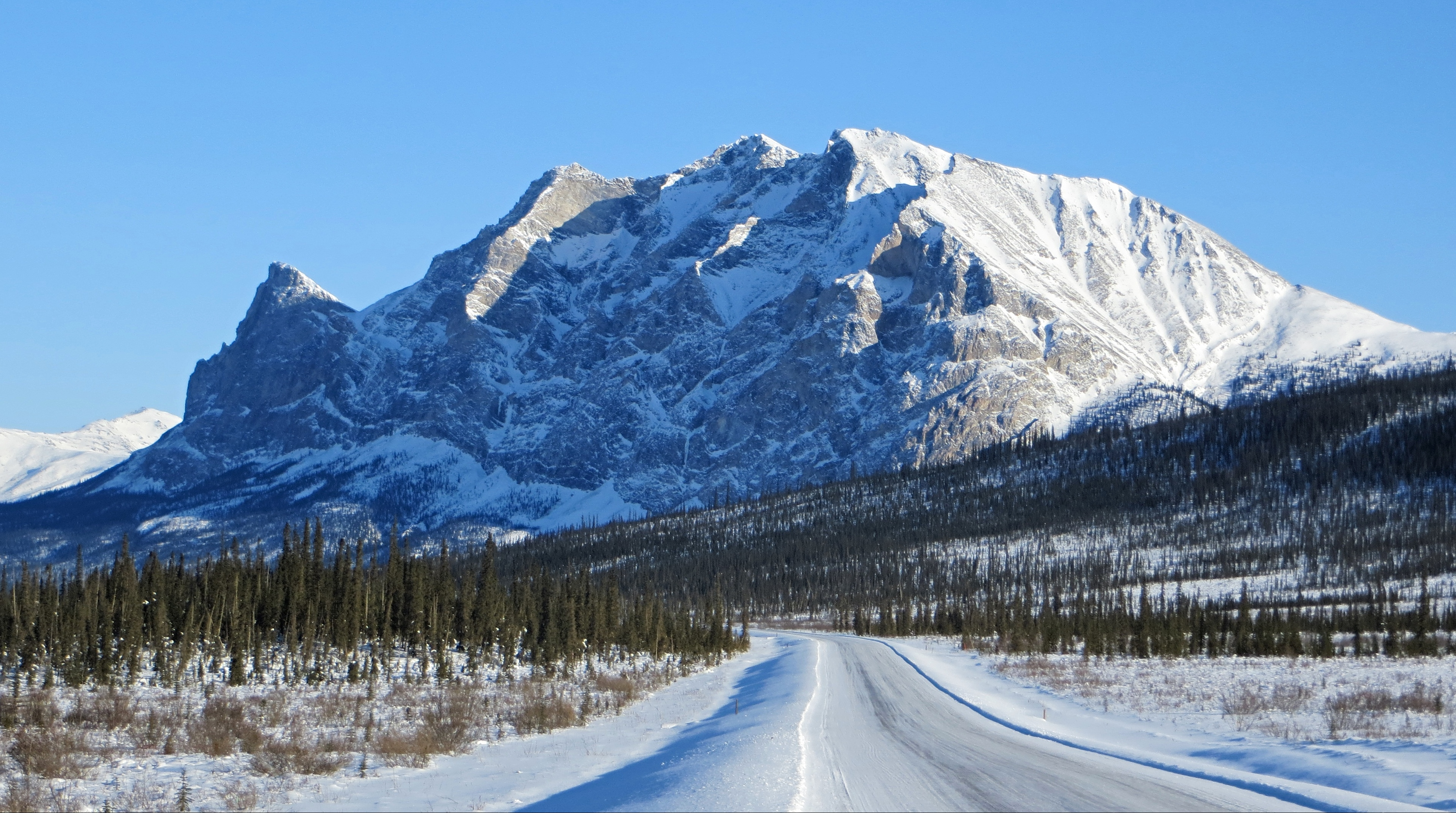

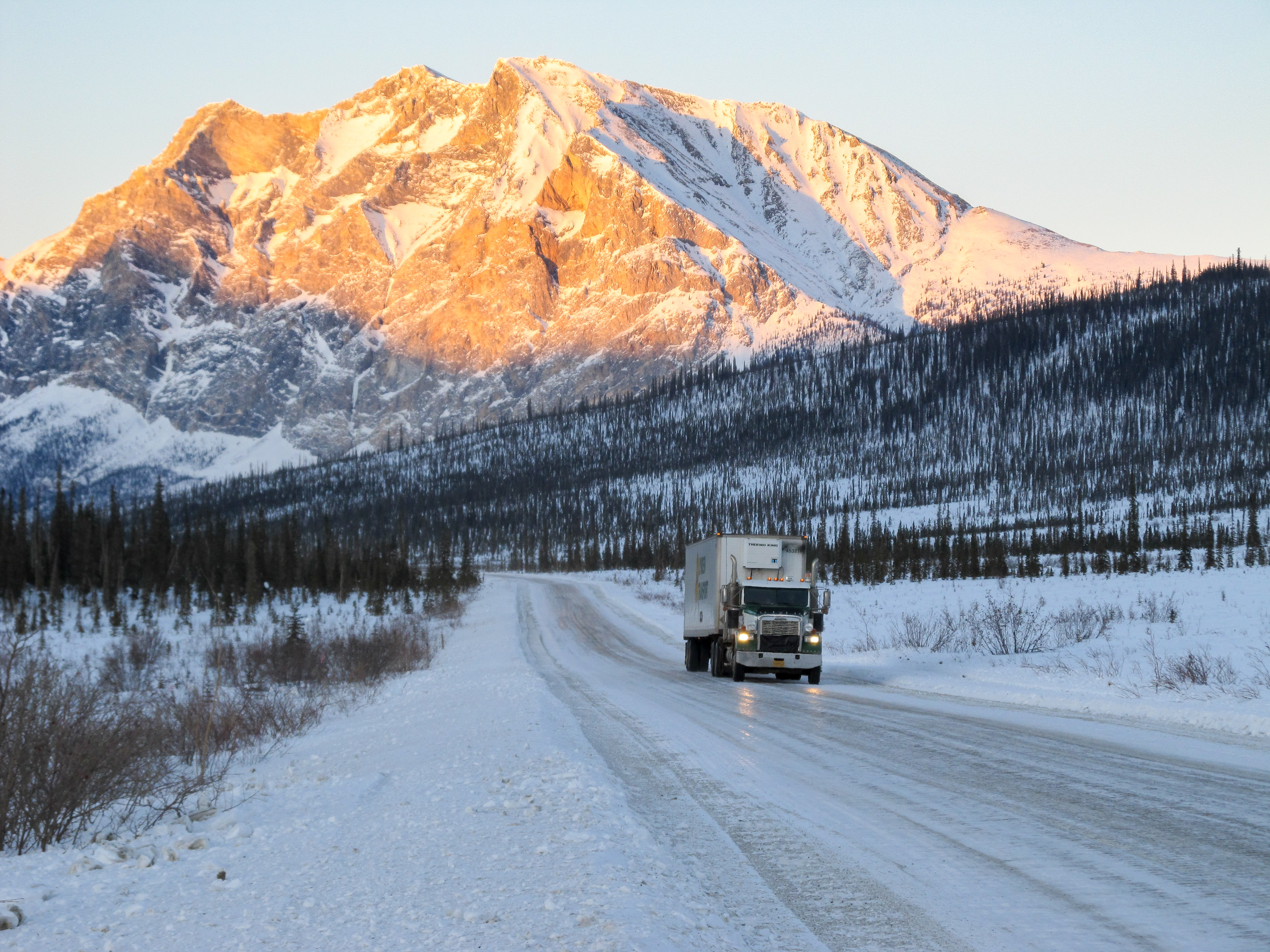

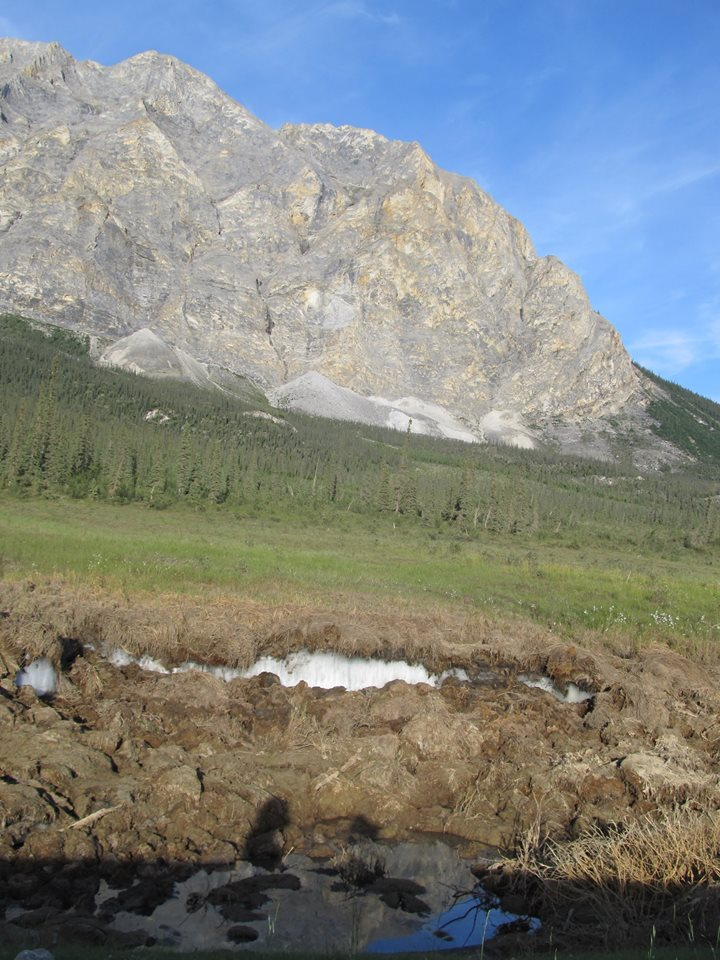
Palsa

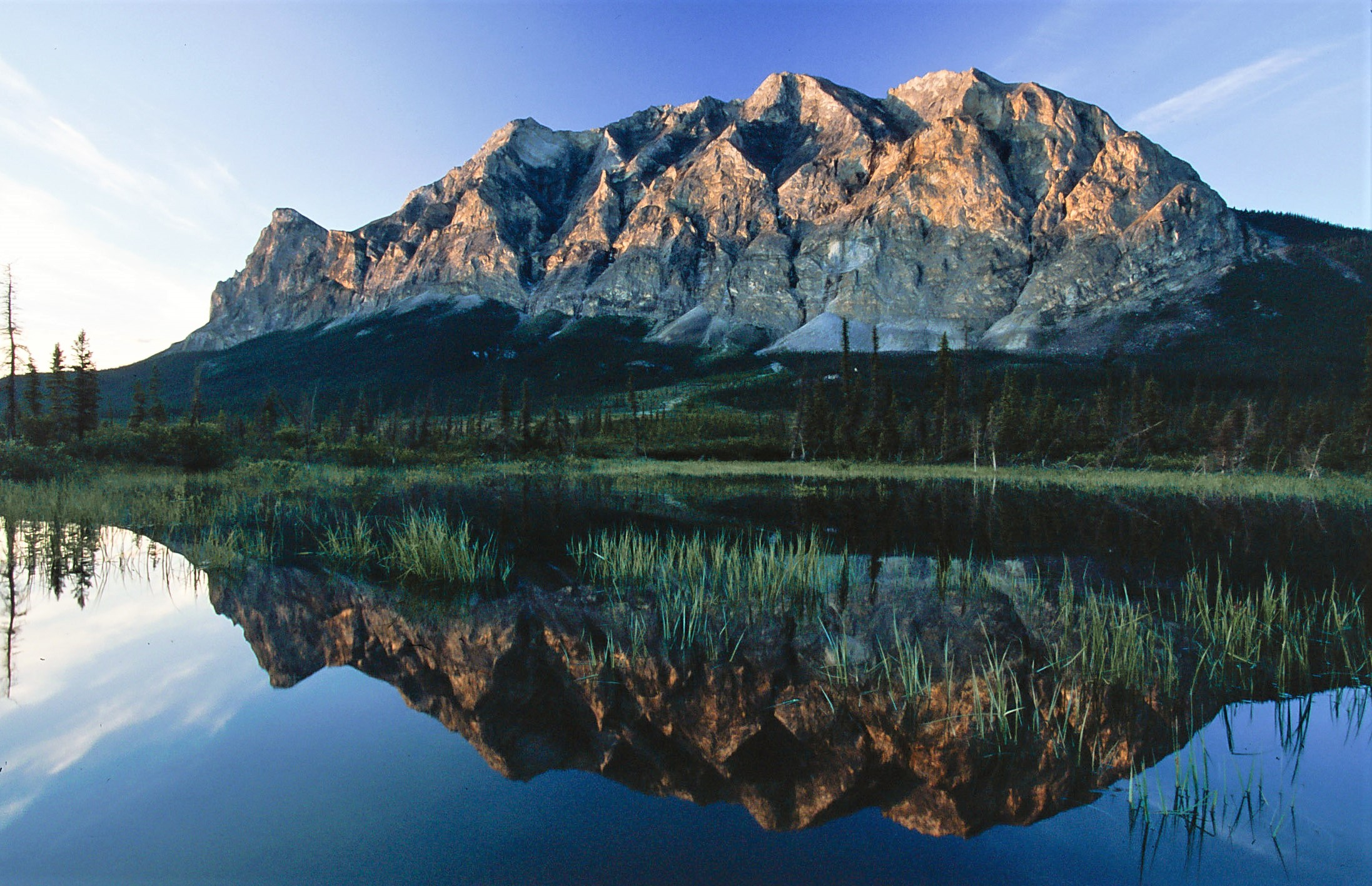

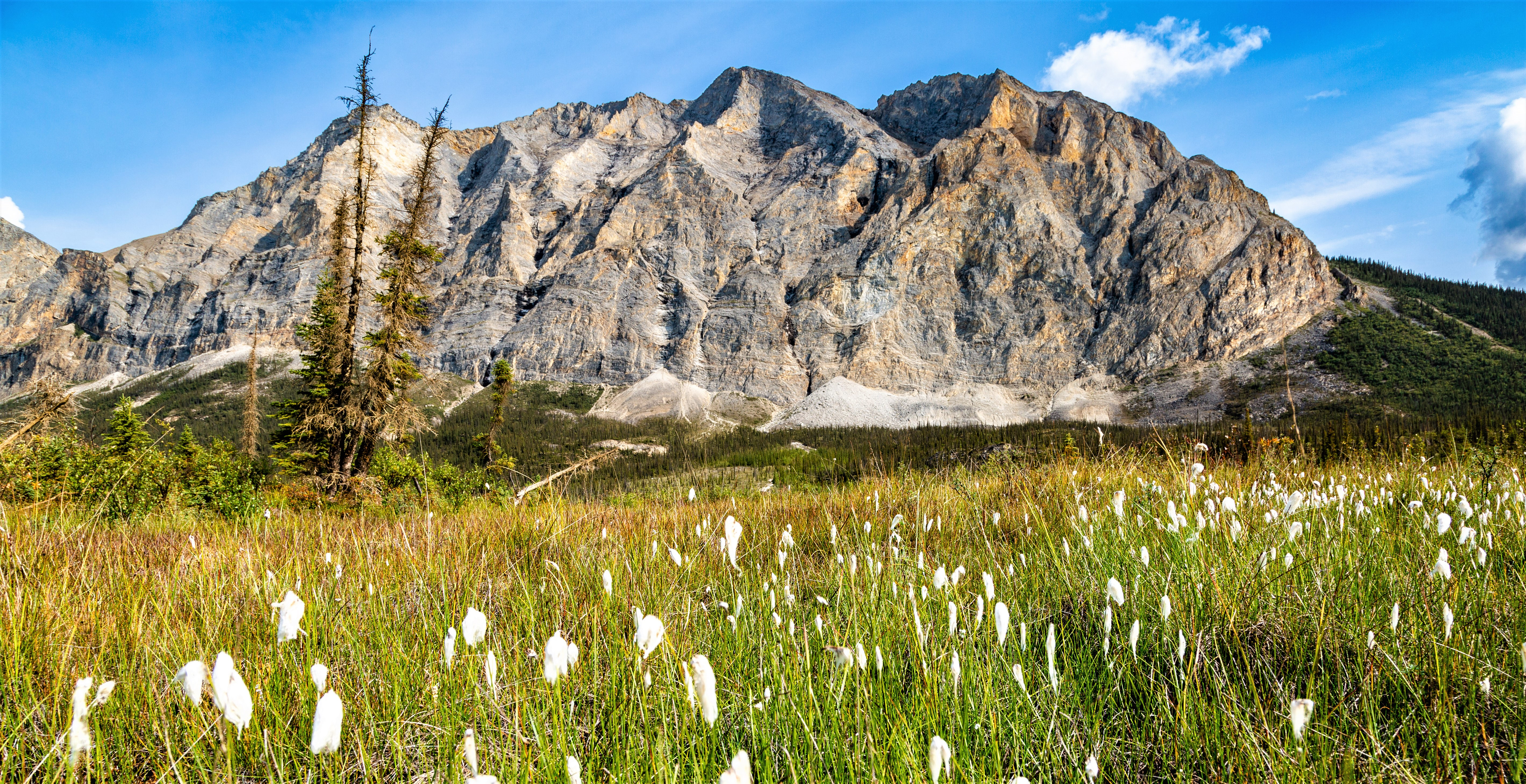
Sukakpak Mountain and cottongrass

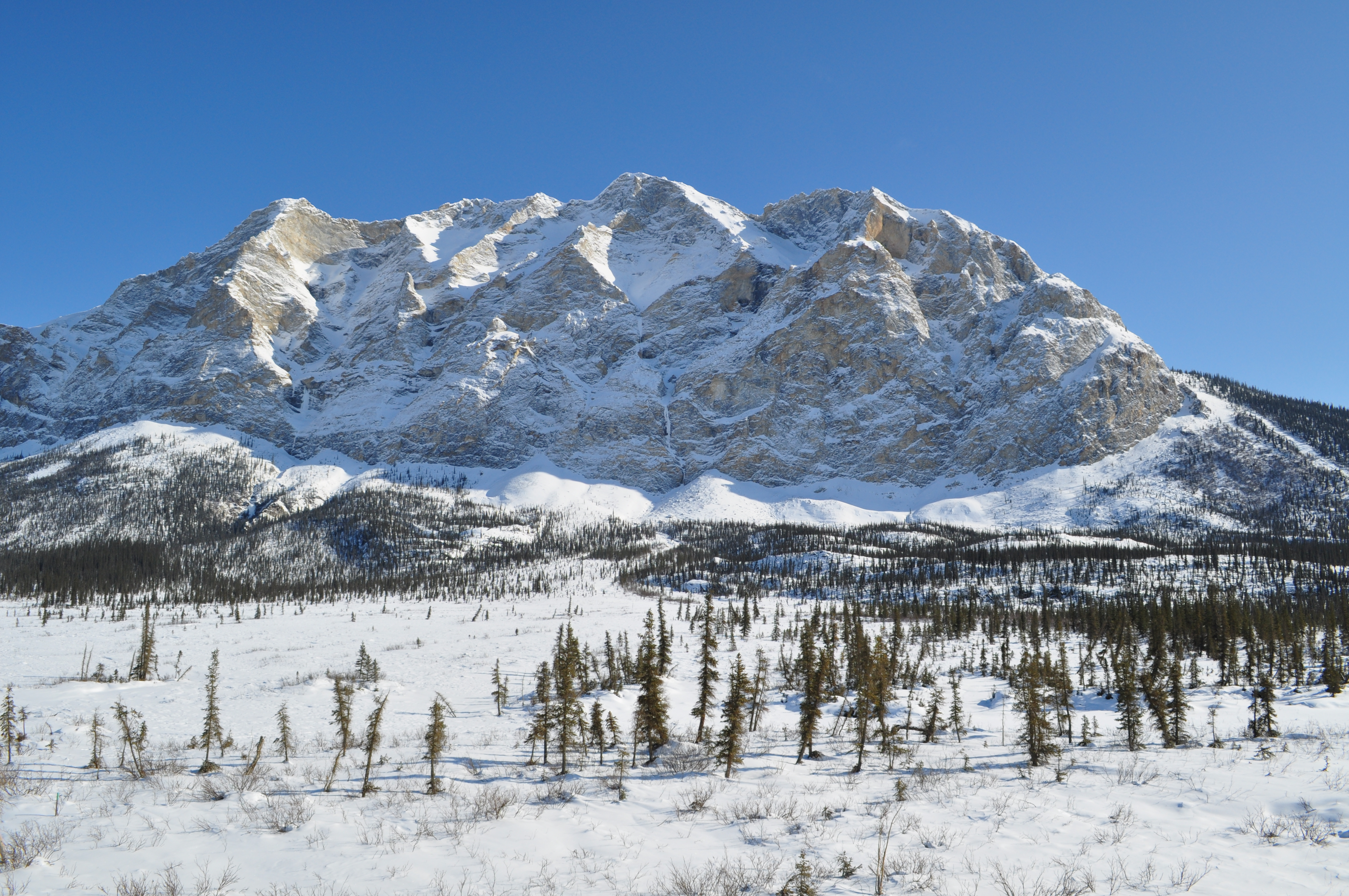

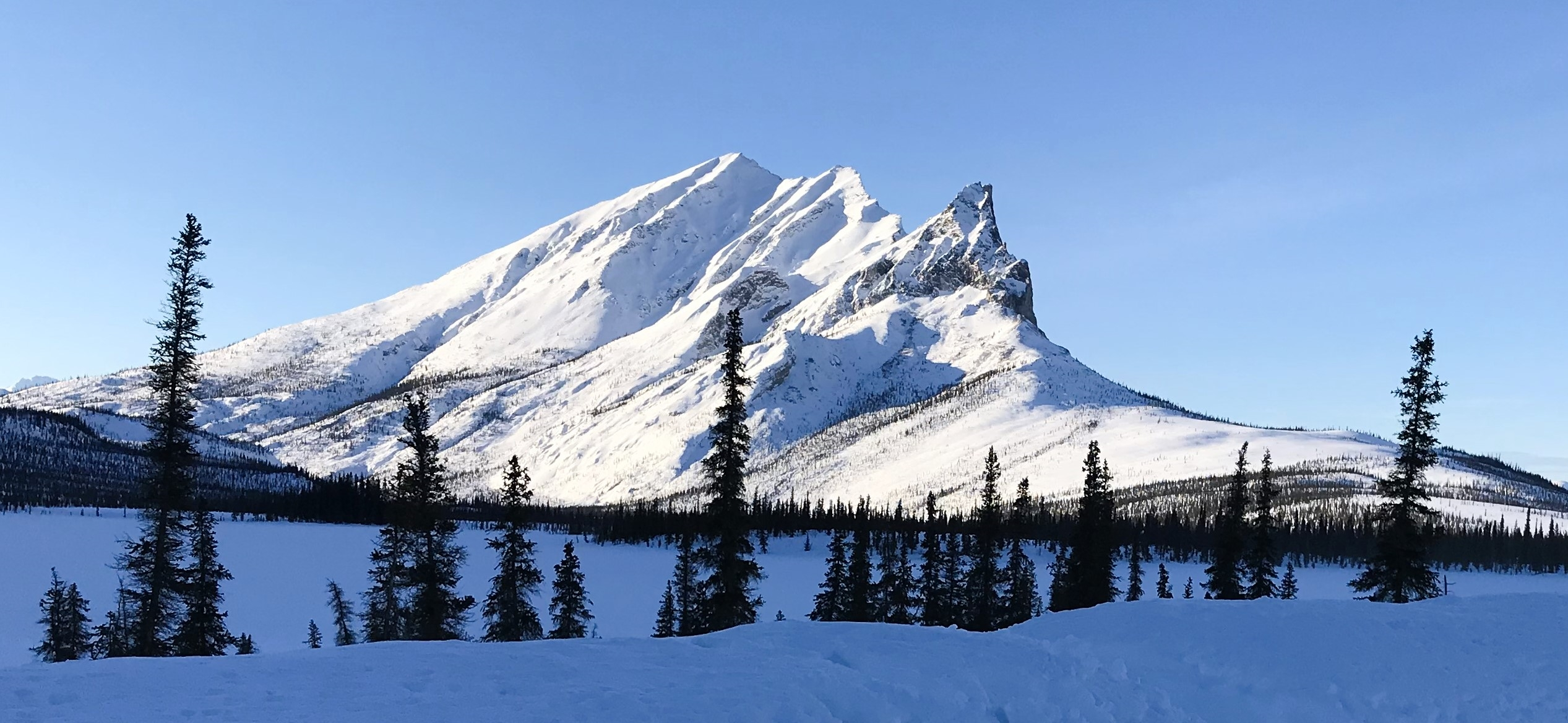

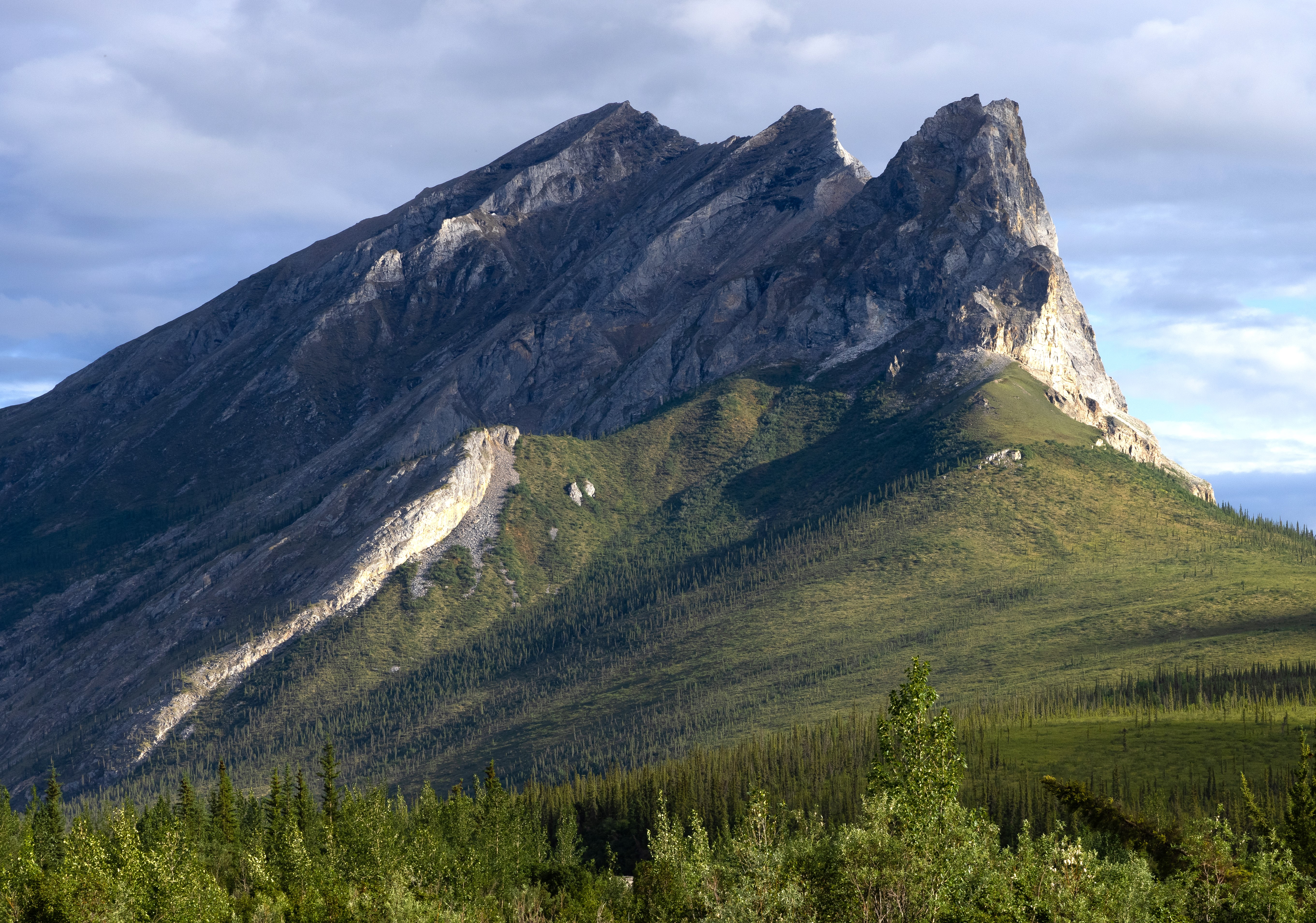
North aspect

== See also ==
- List of mountain peaks of Alaska
- Geography of Alaska
- Snowden Mountain
