= Construction of the Trans-Alaska Pipeline System =

The construction of the Trans-Alaska Pipeline System included over 800 miles (1,300 km) of oil pipeline, 12 pump stations, and a new tanker port. Built largely on permafrost during 1975–77 between Prudhoe Bay and Valdez, Alaska, the $8 billion effort required tens of thousands of people, often working in extreme temperatures and conditions, the invention of specialized construction techniques, and the construction of a new road, the Dalton Highway.

The first section of pipe was laid in 1975 after more than five years of legal and political arguments. Allegations of faulty welds drew intense scrutiny from local and national observers. A culture grew around the unique working conditions involved in constructing the pipeline, and each union that worked on the project had a different function and stereotype. Thirty-two Alyeska Pipeline Service Company employees and contract workers were killed during the project. The main construction effort lasted until 1977; the first barrel of oil was delivered on July 28 of that year. Several more pump stations, added as oil flow increased, were completed through 1980.

== Survey and design ==
Intensive geological sampling and survey work of the pipeline route started in spring 1970. Aerial photographs were taken, examined, and a preliminary route was detailed. Small survey parties physically visited the route and hammered stakes into the ground. The work was difficult; animal dangers forced the crews to be armed, and they also had to cope with the remote area and limited infrastructure. In places, the foliage was so dense that trees had to be cut down and progress was limited to 20,000 feet (6.1 km) per day. The surveyed route passed through several mountain passes: Atigun Pass, Isabel Pass, Thompson Pass, and Keystone Canyon. In the latter location, surveyors had to rappel down cliffs in order to perform their work.

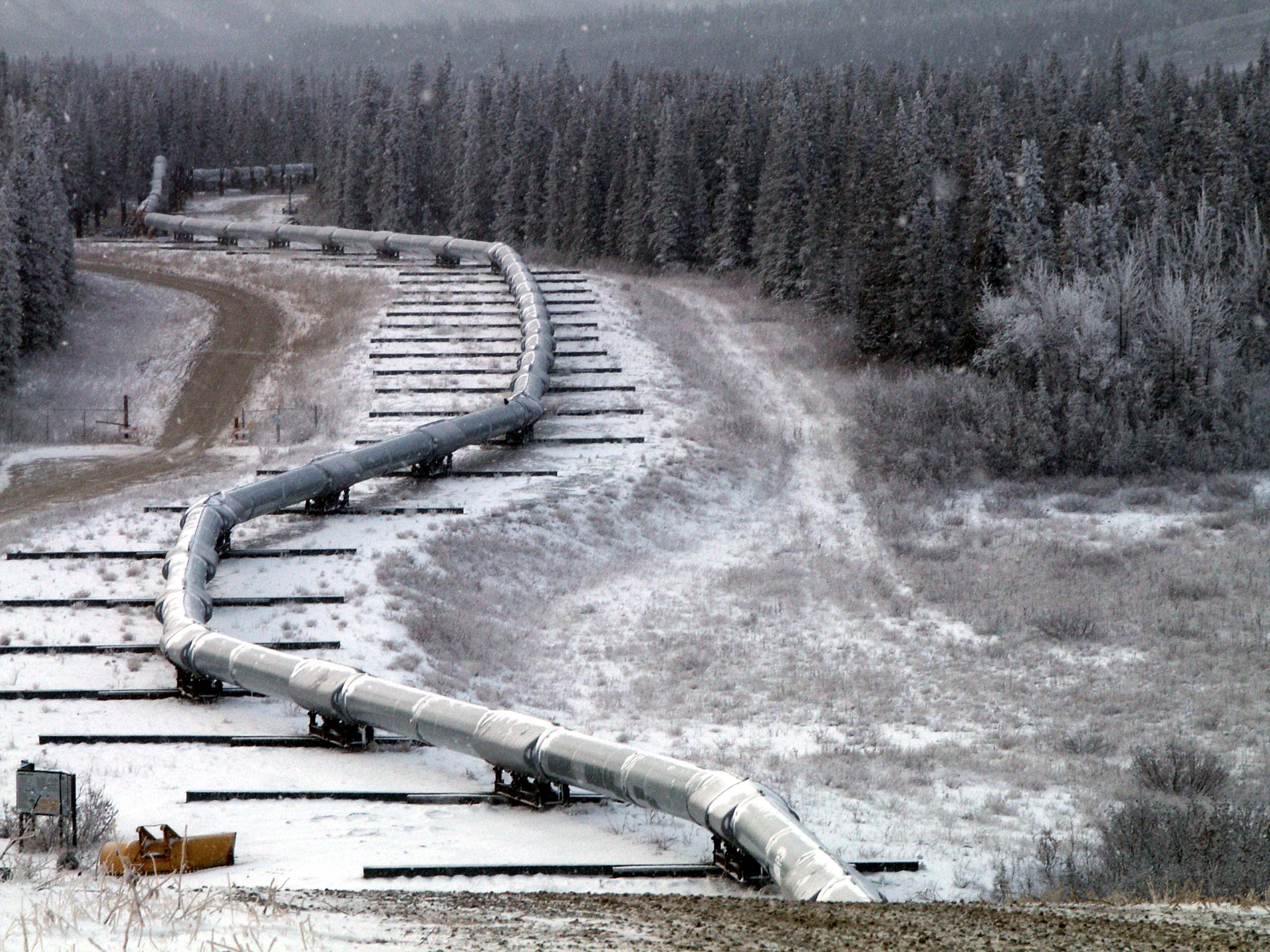
Pipeline on slider supports where it crosses the Denali Fault.

Surveyors and planners also had to deal with the Denali Fault, a major cause of earthquakes, and with large amounts of permafrost. In 1969, the unincorporated Trans-Alaska Pipeline System group drilled a series of core samples north of the Brooks Range that demonstrated how ubiquitous the permafrost was along the route. This forced the design of an elevated pipeline, which was tested in a 1,000 feet (300 m) loop built near Barrow. This elevation required the pipeline to be insulated, since extreme cold temperatures caused the metal to become brittle, even when hot oil was being pumped through the pipeline.

After ecological objections forced subterranean pipeline crossings (in order to allow caribou to cross), engineers developed a system by which the ground near the pipeline would be refrigerated by chilled brine. These refrigerated sections also would be placed in Styrofoam-lined trenches and covered with gravel for their insulation value. Altogether, 3.5 miles (5.6 km) of the pipeline was designed to be built underground in this way. In other places, a lack of permafrost meant it could simply be placed underground without a special refrigeration plant. Large amounts of gravel were needed for all sections of the pipeline as insulation to keep the heat of above-ground structures from melting the permafrost. Gravel also was needed to build the construction and maintenance road, and surveyors located 470 sites across Alaska where the needed 65,000,000 cubic yards (50,000,000 m^{3}) of rock could be located.

The Pipeline Authorization Act required the pipeline to be able to withstand the maximum earthquake ever recorded in the area it was built. When crossing the Denali Fault, Teflon-coated sliders were designed to allow the pipeline to move side-to-side in an earthquake. To protect against forward-and-backward shocks and to allow for thermal expansion, the pipeline wasn't designed as a straight line. Instead, it was intended to be laid in an S-shape, and the bends would allow for expansion and movement without breaking.

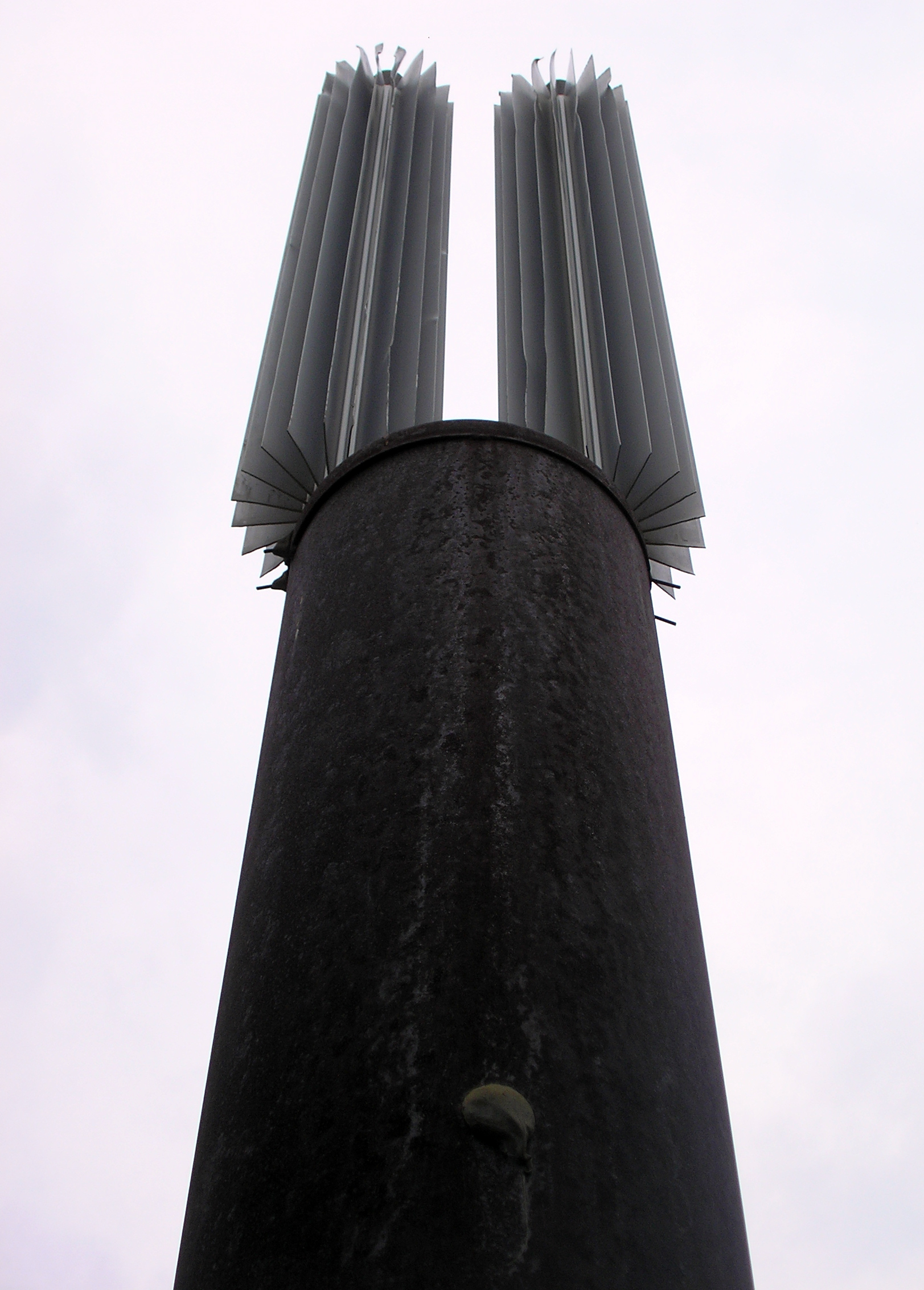
Radiators atop heat pipes keep permafrost below the pipeline frozen.

Because most of the pipeline was built above permafrost, each of the pipes holding up the raised sections of pipeline contained a sealed tube of ammonia. As the permafrost below the pipeline warms, the ammonia absorbs the heat and rises to a radiator on top of each stanchion. The ammonia is cooled by the outside air, condenses, and falls back to the bottom of the tube, where the process repeats.

The surveyed route crossed hundreds of streams and rivers. To cross these with the pipeline, engineers designed concrete "jackets" to surround the pipe and weight it down so it would sink to the bottom of the stream or river. Because oil is lighter than water, the pipeline would float without the concrete jackets. Dredging rivers and burying the pipeline in the streambed was not allowed due to environmental concerns. In several places—either out of fear of disturbing the river or because of the river's characteristics—pipeline bridges were constructed. The most notable of these are over the Yukon River and the Tanana River. To protect against corrosion in these wet environments, the pipeline was designed with cathodic protection.

In terms of spill prevention, the pipeline was designed with one-way valves (so oil moving ahead could not leak out of a hole behind a certain point), computer-aided leak detection, and other features. The pipeline was designed to be pressurized, so any leak would be instantly detected by a loss of pressure at one of the pump stations, which could sound an alarm and halt the flow of oil quickly.

The original pipeline proposal called for an initial capacity of 0.6 million barrels per day (95,000 m^{3}/d), then an increase to 1.2 million barrels per day (190,000 m^{3}/d) after two years, and then a further increase to 2 million barrels per day (320,000 m^{3}/d) at an indeterminate time thereafter. The events of the 1973 oil crisis caused a review of these plans, and the initial capacity was revised upwards to 1.2 million barrels per day (190,000 m^{3}/d). This in turn required that eight pumping stations (instead of the originally-planned five) be ready at startup, greatly increasing the construction manpower required.

=== Valdez Marine Terminal ===
The Valdez Marine Terminal, the southern end of the pipeline, was planned for a site across the Port Valdez fjord from Valdez proper. Initial studies predicted bedrock would be six feet below the surface of the ground, but when excavation began, it was discovered that bedrock was actually sixty feet down, requiring the removal of 15,000,000 cubic yards (11,000,000 m^{3}) of overburden. The terminal itself was designed to be built with four tanker berths and space for a fifth, should it become necessary. Holding tanks were planned that had a capacity equal to that of the pipeline, allowing the whole pipeline to be emptied if required. As required by the Pipeline Authorization Act, a ballast-water filtration system had to be designed as well. This system removes oil from tankers' ballast water so it is not released into Prince William Sound—something fishermen feared when the pipeline was proposed.

== Preparation ==
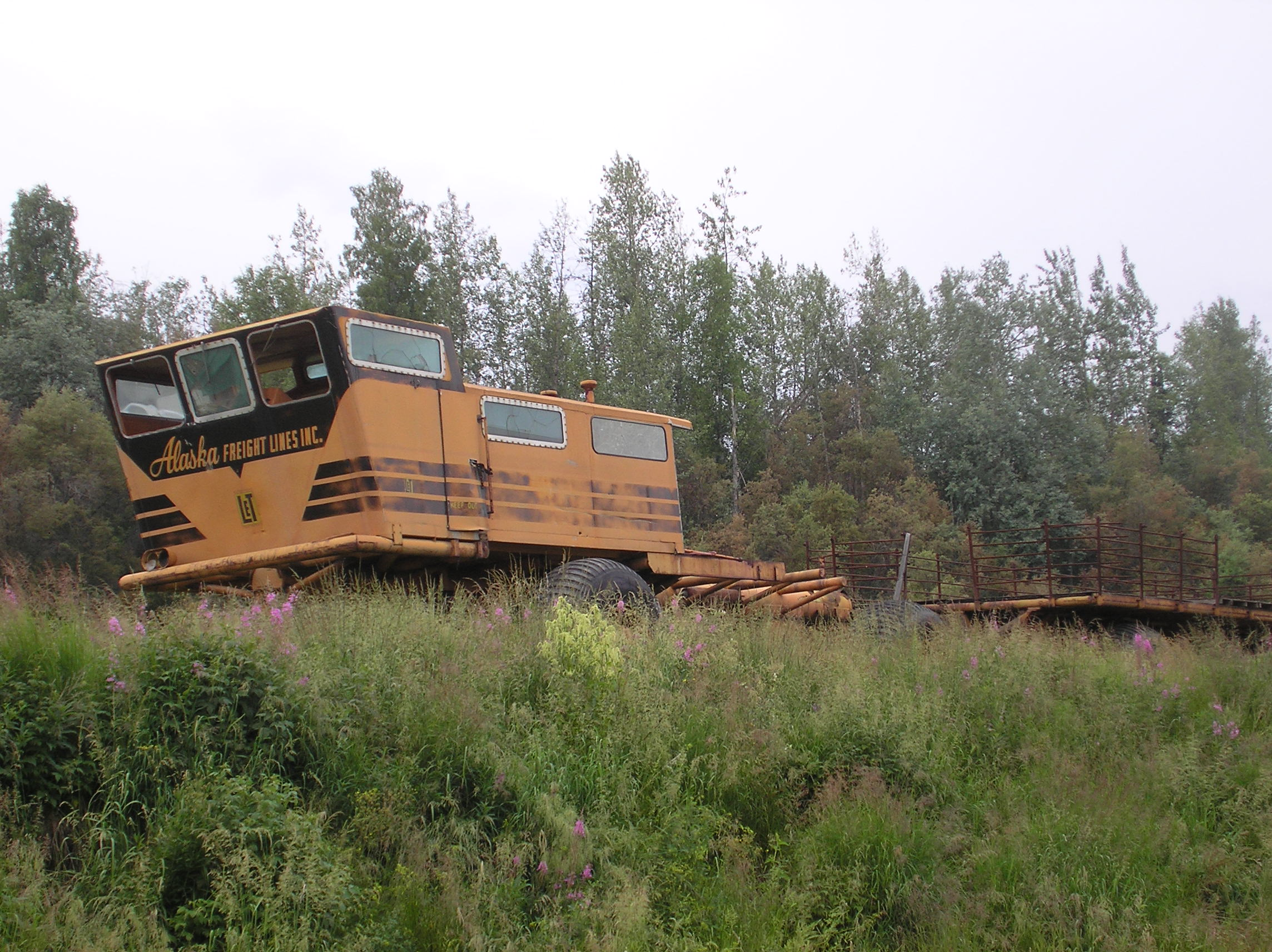
Before construction of the Dalton Highway, special vehicles like the Sno-Freighter were needed to take supplies north of the Yukon River.

Shortly after the permit was signed, convoys of equipment on snow tractors began heading north, using hardened snow roads and an ice bridge over the Yukon River to reach the seven construction camps that had been dormant since 1970. In the 83 days from mid-January to the time the snow and ice melted in mid-April, 680 workers moved 34,000 short tons (31,000,000 kg) to the seven camps, and built five more camps and five temporary airstrips.

In February, as the ice bridge and snow road were carrying tracked vehicles north, Alyeska awarded a contract to design the construction and maintenance road, Michael Baker, Jr., Inc., a firm in Pennsylvania, was awarded the contract. For the road and pipeline to cross the Yukon River, the state of Alaska designed the E. L. Patton Yukon River Bridge and paid two-thirds of its cost. The remaining third was paid by Alyeska, and the bridge was built by Manson-Osberg-Ghemm. On April 5, the contracts to build the road were picked. In total, the new Dalton Highway cost $185 million to build, and four companies shared that cost. Construction of the Dalton Highway started on April 29, and at the peak of the effort, Alyeska and the four subcontractors had more than 3,400 workers deployed from the Yukon River to Prudhoe Bay. A massive airlift was created to supply the road construction effort; more than 700 flights per day—170,000 in total—were required before the road was finished on September 29. In just 154 days, a 360-mile gravel road had been built. Final grading had to be done and more than 20 small permanent bridges had to be built, but by November, the road was open to traffic crossing the Yukon River on another ice bridge.

=== Management ===
To supervise the construction of the pipeline, Alyeska appointed two construction management contractors to oversee all the other subcontractors in the project. Bechtel Corporation, from San Francisco, was named the management contractor for the pipeline itself. Fluor Alaska Inc., a division of Fluor Corp., was named the management contractor for the pumping stations and Valdez Marine Terminal, which was the most complex single section of the pipeline, since it involved the transfer of oil from the pipeline to seagoing oil tankers.

Neither of those two companies actually did the construction work. That job was handed off to a series of subcontractors, each of whom had responsibility on one (or two) of six sections of the pipeline (seven, if the marine terminal is included). Bidding on the subcontracting jobs opened at the end of March, and the contracts were announced on June 12, 1974.

On Section One, which ran 153 miles (246 km) from Valdez to the Sourdough pipeline camp, River Construction Corporation, a division of Morrison–Knudsen, was given the contract. For Section Two, which covered 149 miles (240 km) from Sourdough to north of Delta Junction, Perini Arctic Associates, a joint venture of Perini Corporation, Majestic Construction, Wiley Oilfield Hauling Ltd., and McKinney Drilling Company. Section Three covered 144 miles (232 km) from Delta Junction, past Fairbanks, and almost to the Yukon. The contract for this section was given to H.C. Price, a group formed by H.C. Price Company (usually known as PPCO), R.B. Potashnick, Codell Construction Company, and Oman Construction Company.

Section Four was 143 miles (230 km) from south of the Yukon to Coldfoot. It was contracted to Associated-Green, a group formed by Associated Pipeline Contractors, Inc. and Green Construction Company. The group also was one of the main contractors for construction of the Dalton Highway. Section Five covered the distance from Coldfoot to Toolik pipeline camp, and Section Six went from Toolik to Prudhoe Bay. Together, the two sections covered 210 miles (340 km), and they both were under the supervision of Arctic Constructors, a venture of Brown & Root Inc., Ingram Corporation, Peter Kiewit Sons Inc., Williams Brothers Alaska, Inc., and H.B. Zachry Company.

In Valdez, where Fluor had supervision, the work also was divided among several contractors. Site preparation work was done by Morrison-Knudsen. Chicago Bridge & Iron Company built the tank farms, the tanker berths were built by Kiewest (a venture of Peter Kiewit Sons and Willamette-Western Corporation), and General Electric insulated the pipes. Fluor also had supervision of the construction of the pumping stations, which were generally built by the contractors working on a specific section of the pipeline.

=== Pipeline camps ===
A map of the Trans-Alaska Pipeline with pump stations and construction camps identified.

When the contracts were announced, Alyeska already had 12 pipeline construction camps either built or under construction. These camps were all north of the Yukon, however, and camps had to be built along the entire length of the project. Alyeska planned for 29 construction camps, but 31 were created. Seven were built along the pipeline south of the Yukon, and one was built at each of the 12 pump stations along the length of the route.

The camps were built on thick beds of gravel laid down to insulate the underlying permafrost and to prevent pollution. At the conclusion of the construction project, the gravel was removed, theoretically removing oil leaks and other pollution with it. Atop the gravel were prefabricated modular buildings either flown to the site or trucked across the Dalton Highway. The standardized structures could house 28 people, and two typically were bolted together to create two "wings". All were one-story, except at Valdez and at the pump station camps, where modules were laid atop one another because of space concerns. In addition to the gravel insulation, both buildings and utility conduits were raised above the ground to avoid heating permafrost.

The camps housed from 250 people (at each pump station) to 3,500 people (at Valdez). A typical pump station camp cost $6 million to build, while the typical mainline camps cost about $10 million to build. The camps had beds for 16,500 workers and were collectively referred to as "Skinny City" by workers. The name came from the fact that the "city" was 800 miles (1,300 km) long, but only a few hundred feet wide.

Overall construction headquarters was at Fort Wainwright near Fairbanks, where Alyeska leased land and buildings from the U.S. Army. Vacant barracks were converted into housing, and vacant offices were given to oil workers. As air traffic increased, Alyeska arranged for the use of Fort Wainwright's airfield to relieve the burden on Fairbanks International Airport. The camp at Wainwright was the only one that did not use prefabricated buildings.

== Workers ==
The Trans-Alaska Pipeline System was built entirely with unionized labor. Because construction was slumping in the United States at large, the pipeline drew workers from across the country. These workers had to follow a strict hiring process based on union seniority and the labor that was needed. Priority was given to hiring Alaska residents and Alaska Natives, as well as females, who were considered a minority, and no strikes were permitted by a labor agreement between Alyeska and the unions. In exchange for abiding by these restrictions, workers were paid extremely well and received fringe benefits. According to the labor contract, every worker was guaranteed 40 hours' pay per week, even if weather made work impossible. In addition, subcontractors had cost-plus contracts with Alyeska for staffing, so there was no incentive to keep staffing levels low. These factors often led to more people being assigned to a job than there was work to do in an attempt to make up time lost to weather delays. At the peak of construction in fall 1975, more than 28,000 people were working on the pipeline. Fourteen to 19 percent of the workers were minorities, and 5 to 10 percent were women. Because of the high turnover on the project, more than 70,000 people worked on at least a part of the pipeline.

=== Welders ===
The welders who worked on the pipeline itself came from Pipeliners Local 798 out of Tulsa, Oklahoma, which specialize in providing welders for large-scale pipeline projects. Members of the United Association of Journeymen and Apprentices of the Plumbing, Pipefitting and Sprinkler Fitting Industry of the United States and Canada performed all welding that was not a part of the pipeline itself, including pump stations, feeder pipelines, and work at the Valdez Marine Terminal. The welders were the highest paid of all the workers on the pipeline, with a normal rate of $18.25 per hour. To be hired on the pipeline project, welders had to go through an intensive certification process that involved a series of test welds. If a welder failed any of the test welds, he was not hired and was not allowed to try again for several weeks.

Most 798ers were characterized by a Southern accent, cowboy boots, and unique welder's hats. They were the only people to weld the 48-inch (120 cm) pipe of the main pipeline, and outside observers characterized them as arrogant and "redneck". An example of their attitude was how they dealt with the situation regarding lunch, in late 1975. Alyeska had said they would provide hot lunches wherever possible, and in reality this ended up being whoever was working closest to the camps, while those working further away carried bagged lunches to their worksite. After complaints of how this was unfair (since certain unions were far more favored than others by this policy), Alyeska decided that no one would get hot lunches. But then the welders from 798 starting cooking their own lunches (against camp rules) using steaks taken from the kitchen freezers on makeshift grills whose burners were their acetylene torches. As a fellow welder stated at the time, "Take your typical 798 pipeline welder and feed him a few drinks, and he'll probably tell you that he's God's greatest gift to welding." This attitude generated resentment from other pipeline workers, and the conflict caused large-scale brawls. In some instances, Alaska State Troopers had to be flown to pipeline camps in order to break up small riots. Toward the end of the pipeline project, a series of bumper stickers was produced with the slogan "Happiness is 10,000 Okies going south with a Texan under each arm".

=== Teamsters ===
The Teamsters Union was by far the largest and most notable contributor of workers to the pipeline project. Teamsters worked in the transportation and supply aspects of the project. All trucks were driven by Teamsters, supply warehouses were run by Teamsters, and the buses that transported workers from camps to job sites were run by Teamsters. Teamsters Local 959, with more than 23,000 employees at its peak, was by far the most dominant labor force on the pipeline project. There were frequent allegations of corruption by Teamsters on the project, and the Anchorage Daily News won a Pulitzer Prize for a 15-part series on the rise of Local 959 and its influence on state politics. Repeated allegations of links to organized crime were never backed up by evidence, but two Teamsters leaders were murdered in 1976 while investigating drug activity on the pipeline project. Teamsters workers strongly denied any involvement with organized crime, and pointed to the fact that 80 percent of the Teamsters in the project had college degrees or professional and management experience.

The Teamsters' control of tools and equipment in warehouses they ran led to conflicts with other workers. In a few instances, Teamsters were assaulted by workers from other unions. In other instances, the Teamsters used their position to extract concessions from Alyeska and the subcontractors. Although they were forbidden from striking, they were allowed to halt work for safety meetings, and this excuse was used on a handful of occasions. The most notable of these was in February 1975, after a series of serious truck accidents on the Elliott Highway, which connected to the newly built Dalton. The Elliott, which had not been upgraded, was a treacherous drive for trucks hauling 80 feet (24 m) of pipe. After his attempts to get Alyeska to upgrade the road were rebuffed, Teamster leader Jesse Carr stopped all truck traffic in the state for four days of safety meetings. Alyeska and the state promised upgrades to the road, and the traffic resumed.

=== Operators ===
The International Union of Operating Engineers (called Operators for short) represented the men and women who sat at the controls of the heavy equipment used on the construction of the pipeline. This equipment included bulldozers, cranes, drilling rigs, and sidebooms—a cross between a bulldozer and a crane that could lay a section of pipe in a trench parallel to its tracks. Because most of the heavy equipment was unheated, six operators were typically assigned to each piece of equipment, allowing for frequent breaks. A popular joke on the pipeline was that the sole qualification to be an Operator was, "Must be able to sit on a sideboom at 40 below and not freeze up." More seriously, one laborer wrote, was that there was nothing more terrifying than to be in a trench and have a drunken or unskilled Operator handling the pipe that was being laid in the trench.

=== Laborers ===
The Laborers' International Union of North America represented the bulk of the less-skilled labor on the project. Laborers, as they were commonly known, did most of the odd jobs on the project: digging trenches in areas inaccessible by heavy equipment, drilling holes for the pipeline's Vertical Support Members, spreading gravel, crushing rock, and moving supplies by hand. Laborers Local 942 out of Fairbanks was the most prominent Laborers group on the project, and because no special skills were required for the jobs it filled, the Laborers Union attracted most of the people who came to Alaska specifically for the pipeline project. As one Laborer put it, they were people "simply looking for the easiest way possible of getting through the day."

Because the Laborers had more applicants than jobs available, the process for getting a job on the pipeline through Laborers Local 942 was a multi-tiered process. There were multiple levels of eligibility, based on the amount of seniority a person had. A-level members had the first pick of jobs, but they had to have worked at least 800 hours with the union in the previous year. B-level members had to have worked between 100 and 800 hours with the union. C-level members had to have at least two years of experience outside of Alaska or be an Alaska resident for at least one year. D-level was for everyone else, and D-level people rarely got jobs. That didn't stop people from trying. At 11 a.m. on January 1, 1974, shortly before the pipeline right-of-way was signed, more than 100 people spent the night outside the Fairbanks office of the Laborers Union, waiting for the first choice of jobs when the office opened.

=== Pipeline life ===
Life during the pipeline construction project was characterized by long hours, poor conditions, and limited entertainment compensated by excellent benefits and pay. Each worker was handed a small booklet of 23 camp rules, but the rules (including no alcohol or smoking) were frequently broken and became the target of ribald humor.

Within the living quarters, the atmosphere resembled that of a college dormitory. Housekeeping and laundry services were provided, but the quarters were small and little entertainment was available. Television broadcasts were delayed two days because of the need to fly tapes from California, and most workers had to develop their own forms of entertainment. In the winter, some took to skiing or sightseeing; in the summer, some went hiking. In general, however, little time was available for recreation because of the long hours worked by most people.

In the first years of the project, workers were regularly treated to prime rib, steak dinners, and other exotic fare due to a cost-plus contract between the food preparers and the subcontractors. In later years, these cost-plus contracts were replaced, and institutional cooking and box lunches became common, but the food on the project was still prized by many workers. As soon as the haul road, later named the Dalton Highway, was built, the food and the overtime for some unions changed. The highway construction was charged to the federal and state governments and was supposed to be cost plus. There were no more steak nights one to two times a week and the Australian rock lobster tails disappeared. The International Brotherhood of Electrical Workers (IBEW) LU 1547 was one union that had overtime on Sundays changed from double time to time-and-one-half upon completion of the haul road.

In 1976, workers' pay averaged between $11 and $18 per hour, depending on the position. With workweeks averaging between 70 and 84 hours per week, the problem for many workers became what to do with so much extra money. Teamster Jerry Thornhill, a typical worker, wrote to Money magazine, asking for advice. Thornhill detailed a pay rate of $57,000 per year at a time when members of Congress earned $42,500 annually, professional football players averaged $40,000, and U.S. vice president Nelson Rockefeller earned $62,500. The large amounts of money in the pipeline camps and a lack of entertainment caused frequent gambling games that sometimes involved tens of thousands of dollars. Instead of gambling, other workers saved their money for monthlong vacations to Hawaii or other warm climates, then returned to work with no money remaining.

== Laying pipe ==
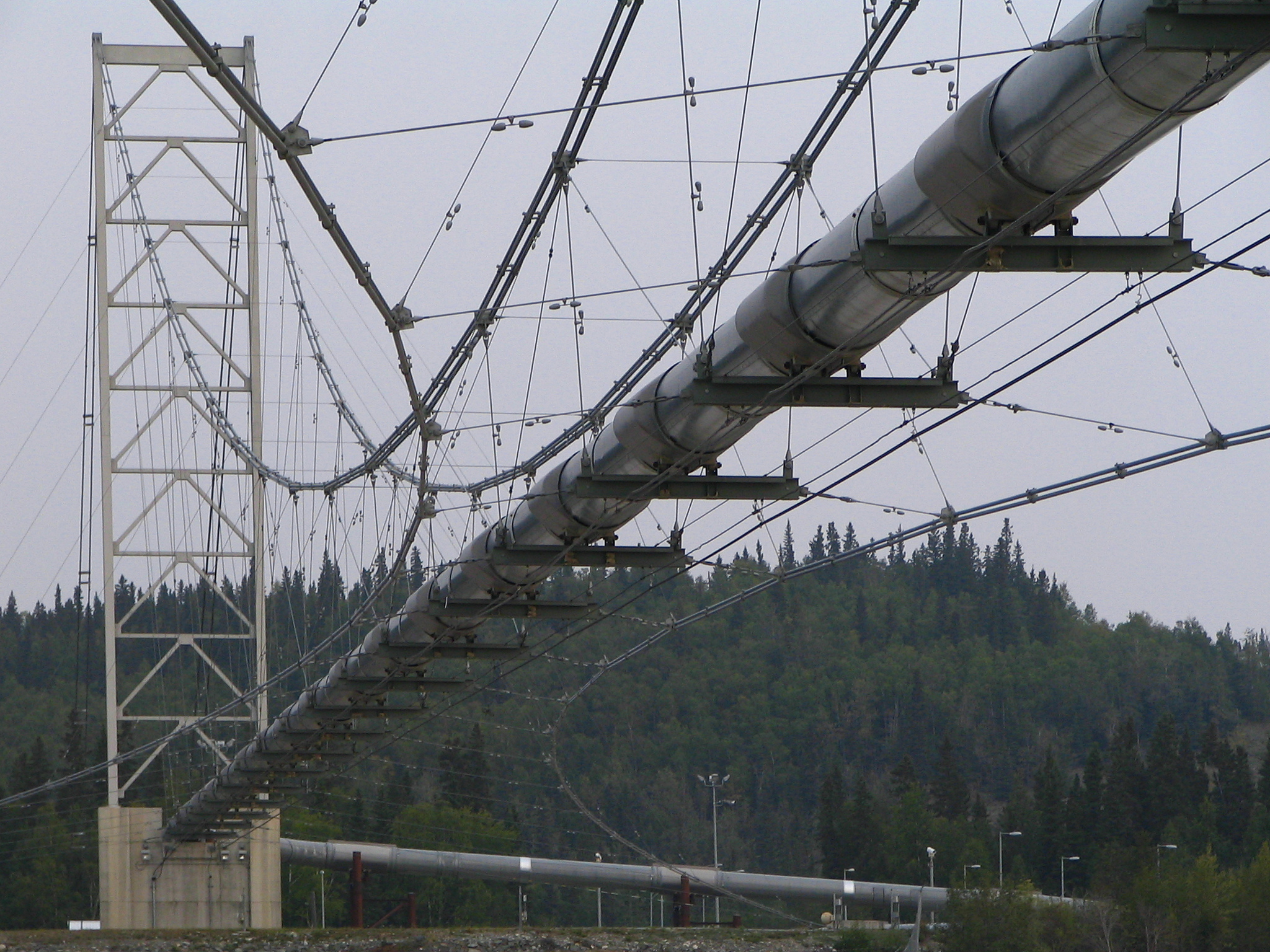
The pipeline crosses the Tanana River on a bridge north of Delta Junction.

The first section of the Trans-Alaska pipeline was laid on March 27, 1975, in the Tonsina River. Several forty-foot sections of pipe were welded together and coated in concrete prior to the ceremony. Twelve sidebooms (bulldozers with side-mounted cranes) together lifted 1,900 feet (580 m) of pipe, which was laid in a trench dug perpendicular to the riverbed. Bulldozers filled in the exposed trench with gravel, restoring the river's original contours. This process was repeated a few miles south, where the pipeline crossed the Little Tonsina River. By the end of April, the first 1,800 feet (550 m) of elevated pipeline also was built in the same area.

In 1975, the first year of pipelaying, Alyeska set a goal of completing 45 percent of the 800-mile route. This would not be laid in a straight line, since it was expected that river crossings would take longer to complete than portions of the pipeline on dry land. Work on the pumping stations and the Valdez Marine Terminal, which had begun in the fall of 1974, also was expected to take longer than laying pipe. Conversely, work on those two projects could proceed during the winter, when pipelaying could not take place due to the frozen ground.

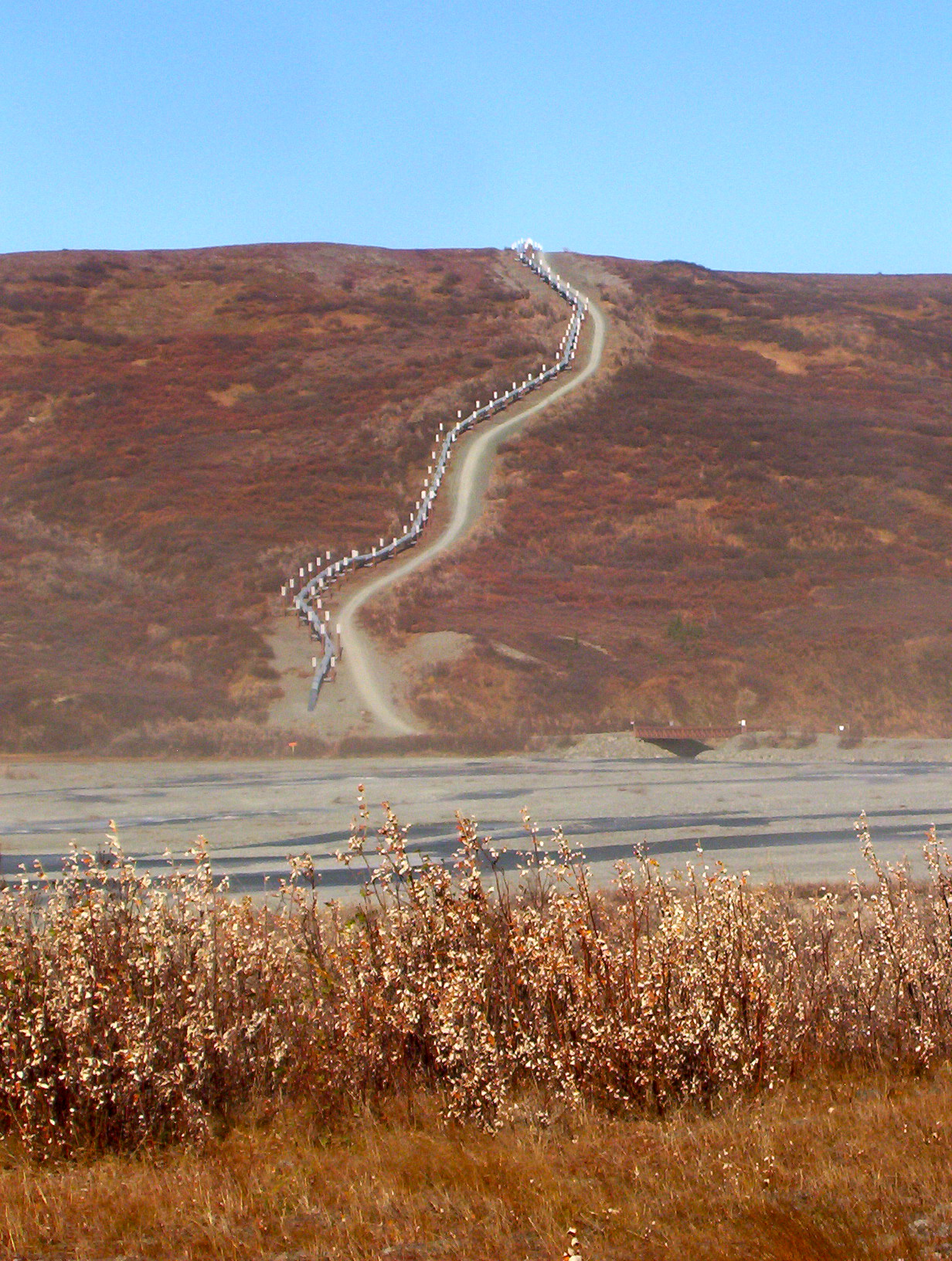
The pipeline runs under this riverbed, emerging to cross a ridge on the opposite bank. Pipeline inspection access road is visible as well

Laying pipe took several stages. First, the right of way had to be cleared with chainsaws, bulldozers, and scrapers who followed the rough route laid out by the initial surveyors. These crews were followed by another group of surveyors and engineers who determined whether the pipeline could be laid in the planned spot, or if it had to be moved because of permafrost, soft ground, or other considerations. State and federal surveillance officers, working with the engineers, could give the OK to move the path of the pipeline as much as 200 feet to the right or left in order to avoid obstacles.

After the path was finalized came the augers and drillers for the holes that served as foundations for the Vertical Support Members that held up the pipe. These holes were drilled and filled with a mix of water, gravel and dirt before a VSM was dropped into each hole. Because of the frozen ground, the gravel and dirt froze as hard as concrete, sealing the VSMs in place. The VSMs were laid in parallel, two at a time, and each had a semicircular rest for the pipeline segments. These were carried in 40-foot or 80-foot segments by crane or sideboom to the appropriate location, lowered into place, then welded together. The welds were then inspected via X-ray by quality control engineers who followed the welders.

The construction progressed under the management of Frank Moolin Jr., an engineer who had worked on refinery projects in Singapore and the construction of the Bay Area Rapid Transit system prior to being named senior project manager. Moolin became known for his work ethic and his hard-driving style. It was said that he was the first person in the office and the last to leave at the end of the day. The Engineering News-Record reported "He demands total dedication, saying, 'Your wife had a baby; so what?'" when it named him the construction industry's Man of the Year in 1976. To spur progress on the pipeline, he started the "Alyeska Sweepstakes", in which each of the five contractors working on the pipeline were compared to each other based on how much of their share they completed on time. In his biggest decision, he canceled Bechtel's contract as management contractor because he felt the company was adding too much bureaucracy between Alyeska and the pipeline contractors. A historian later called the decision "one of the most humiliating defeats" in the history of Bechtel.

In October, snow and cold weather brought most of the pipeline laying to a halt for the year. Employment rose from 12,000 workers in the spring to more than 21,000 in the summer and down to 7,000 at Christmas. Alyeska estimated that the pipeline laying was about 50 percent complete: 390 miles (630 km) of pipeline were welded and in place. But work on the pump stations and in Valdez lagged; the project as a whole was only 35 percent complete when the pumps were factored in.

== Speeding up construction ==
During the winter of 1975–1976, Moolin pronounced himself dissatisfied with progress, but promised improvements. "We've learned an awful lot. This year (1975) was a pull-ourselves-up-by-our-bootstraps operation. We didn't really have our organization set until July, and it wasn't working at top effectiveness until October." To take advantage of that "top effectiveness", Moolin set an ambitious goal for 1976 construction: "We're expecting to have all of the line installed, insulated, and hydro-tested by November 1", he said in January. That goal was ambitious, because most of the work that had been done to that point was on floodplains and flat terrain. Still left to tackle were difficult construction projects in Atigun Pass and Keystone Canyon. "In some areas, we did eat our cake last year", Moolin said.

Even though winter shut down all pipelaying on the right of way, work on the pump stations and in Valdez continued without stop. At Pump Station 1, in Prudhoe Bay, temperatures reached lower than −70 °F (−57 °C), but the work continued. Because the pump station was the origin point for the main pipeline, it also had to process the feeder lines coming from oil wells. The pump station camp had a population of 270 workers through the winter, and it would peak in the summer with 430 workers.

=== Welding controversy ===
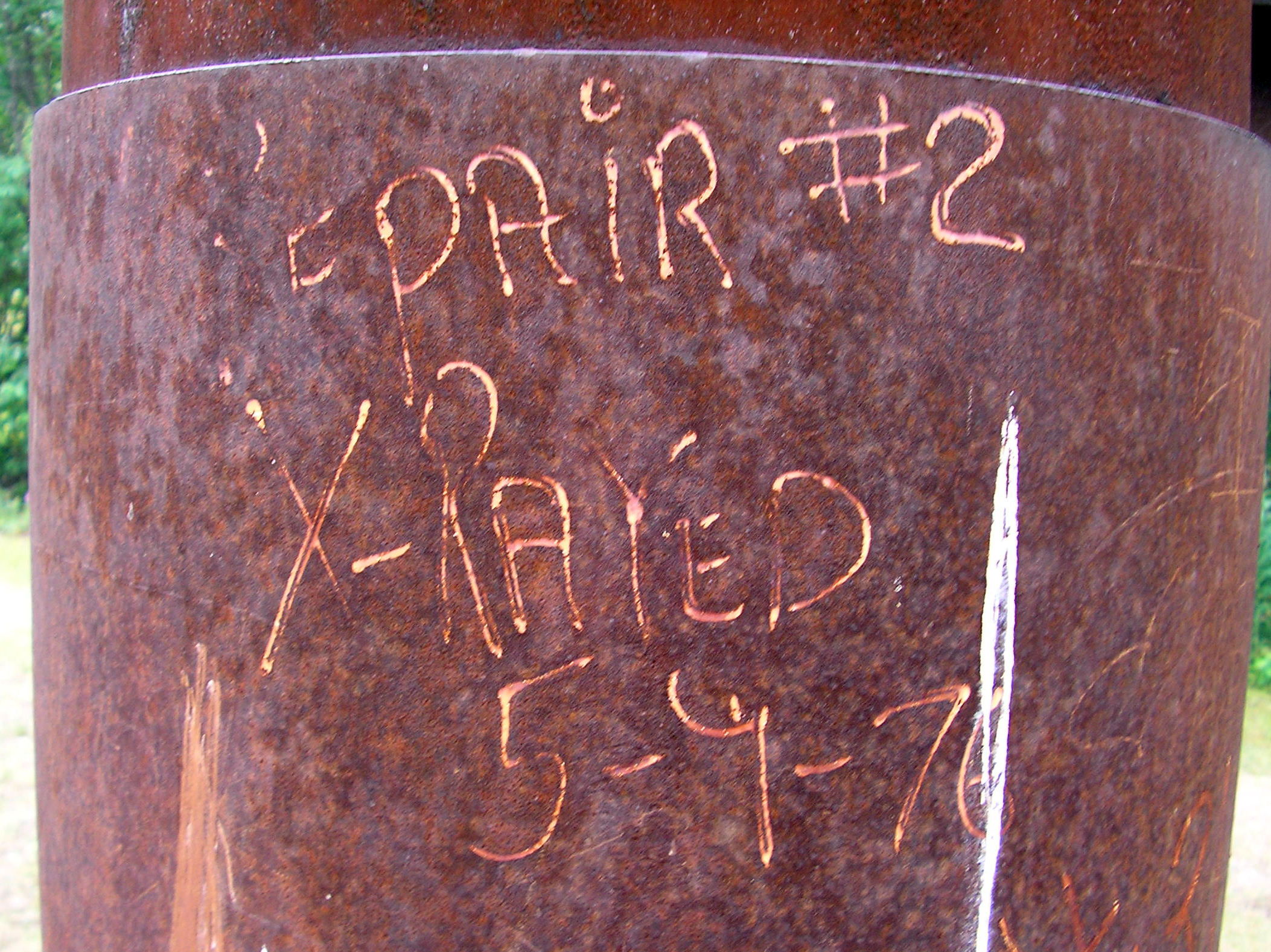
Etchings on a pipeline vertical support member indicates when a nearby weld was X-rayed by quality control inspectors.

As the weather warmed and work resumed on the main pipeline, Alyeska administrators were occupied by a controversy about pipeline welds that had been done the previous year. In September 1975, a former employee of Ketchbaw Industries filed suit against the company, alleging that he had been laid off because he would not participate in a conspiracy to falsify quality control X-rays of pipeline welds. The Trans-Alaska Pipeline was unique among pipeline projects to that point in that it required all welds of the main pipeline to be verified by X-ray. This was a time-consuming process, and the quality-control procedures continually lagged behind the welders.

At the end of 1975, Alyeska terminated Ketchbaw's contract and took responsibility for analyzing weld X-rays itself. The controversy continued, however, as Kelley's lawsuit moved forward, a Ketchbaw manager was found dead of cyanide poisoning, and photographs of welds were stolen from a pump station construction camp. Alyeska began a review of all 30,800 welds that had been done in 1975, and submitted its report to the Interior Department in April 1976. In May, it submitted its technical analysis and a report on repair work under way. The review produced a list of 3,955 questionable welds—10 percent of 1975's work.

Alyeska reported that about half were too minor to affect the running of the pipeline, but questions lay with more than a thousand welds that might be dangerous. Re-examining the welds would be extremely difficult, since those sections of pipeline were sealed (and in many cases buried). By July, the U.S. Congress began holding hearings into the welding problems. President Gerald Ford sent a team to Alaska to oversee and examine Alyeska's work. At the recommendations of this team and to avoid further investigations, Alyeska began repairing the welds on its own. By September, more than 3,000 of the questionable welds had been redone or certified as safe. Alyeska asked for waivers on the remaining 612 welds, and more hearings resulted. By the end of November, only 34 welds were still at issue. The leader of Ford's team ordered 31 of the welds to be dug up and re-done. Waivers were granted for the other three welds only, all of which were buried 17 feet (5.2 m) under the Koyukuk River south of the Brooks Range. Proof of the integrity of those three questionable yet inaccessible welds were evaluated by a unique solution in Section Five north of the Brooks Range. On either side of the Sagavanirktok River, the above ground pipeline was cut and 48 inch fans installed to circulate air. Then a team of 12 men and inspectors riding on wheeled sleds pulled by a modified John Deere lawnmower entered the pipe. Welds were counted during the passage. After arriving at the questionable weld under the Sagavanirktok River, an ultrasound was taken on the inside of the pipe. Then the team exited the pipe on the opposite side and the ultrasound was taken back to camp for evaluation. Alyeska estimated the total cost of redoing the welds to be $55 million.

=== Atigun, Keystone, and Sag River ===
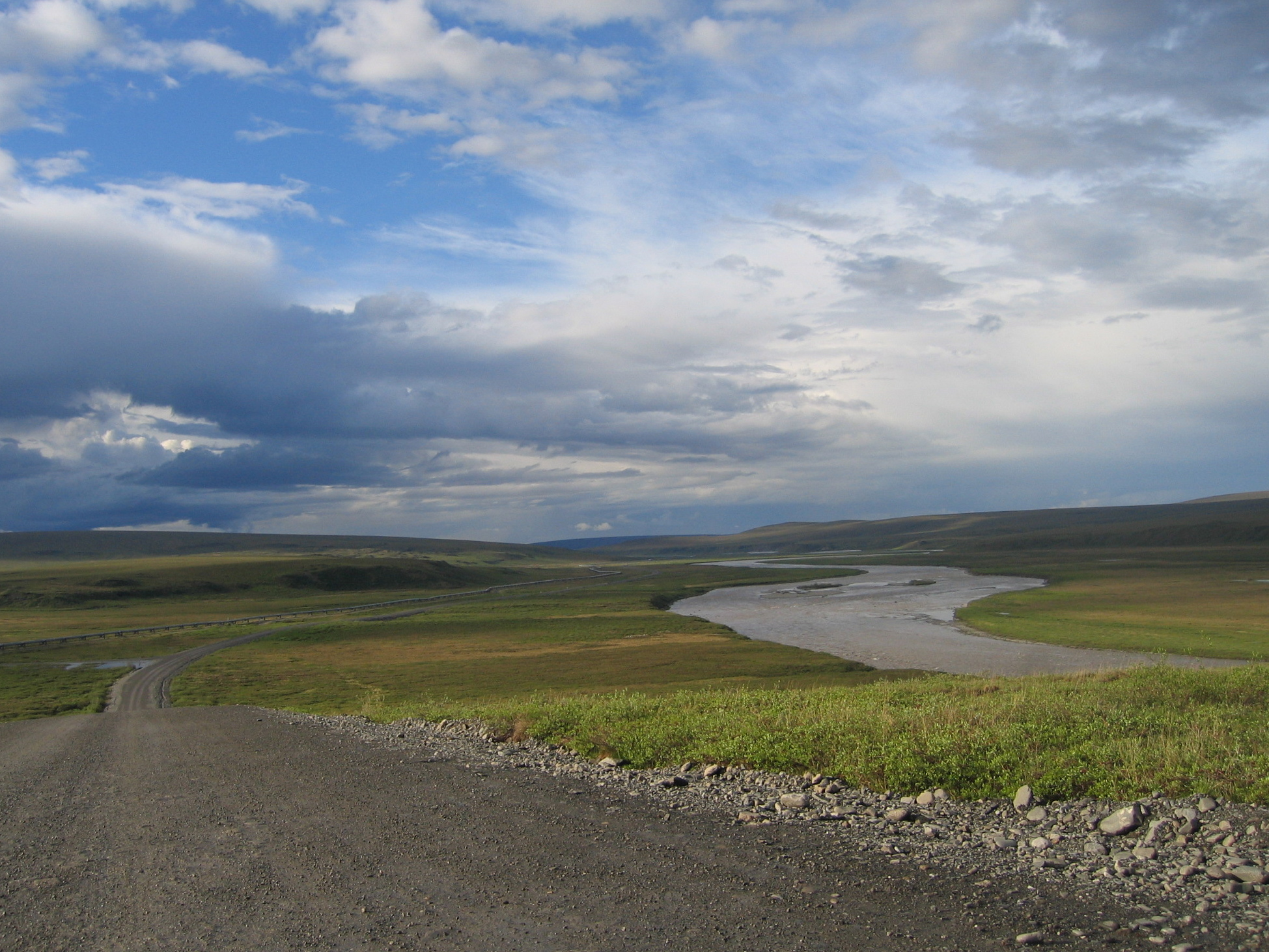
The portion of the pipeline beneath the Sagavanirktok River, seen here, caused problems for construction workers.

Many of the suspected faulty welds were in Section Five of the pipeline construction project—the northernmost 200 miles (320 km). This area also included two of the major problems encountered during the 1976 construction season: Atigun Pass and the Sagavanirktok River (also known as Sag River). The pipeline had been laid in a trench beneath the river in the late fall of 1975. Because it had been laid so late in the season, the trench fill material had frozen and it was impossible to fill the submerged trench containing the pipeline. Spring snowmelt flooded the river and battered the submerged portion of pipe. In June, the battered pipeline broke free of its moorings and a 1,700-foot (518 m) section of concrete-coated pipe floated to the surface of the river. Because doing repair work would interfere with the migration of Arctic char, the Alaska Department of Fish and Game allowed only 24 hours for the project. After preparing the site, it took just four hours for a replacement trench to be dug, a pipe welded and laid in the trench, and the trench to be filled in.

At Atigun Pass, to the south of the Sag River, workers had to deal with a different set of challenges. In 1975, surveyors discovered the pass was filled with permafrost and glacial soils. But because the pass is the site of frequent avalanches, an elevated pipeline was not possible. The solution was to design a reinforced, insulated ditch to lay the pipeline in. The result was a 6,000-foot (1.83 km) long concrete box lined with 21 inches (53 cm) of Styrofoam. The problem then became one of building it before the first snow started falling in October.

At the opposite end of the pipeline, just north of Valdez, engineers coped with the difficulties posed by Keystone Canyon. The canyon was the only route to Valdez, but it was occupied by the Richardson Highway and the Lowe River; no room was available for the pipeline. The only solution was to avoid the canyon by building the pipeline through the Chugach Mountains and at the rim of the canyon. Winter work was made impossible by the more than 300 inches (760 cm) of snow that fell in the winter of 1975-1976, and when the snow melted, construction workers had to figure out how to travel up a 60 percent grade, then lay the pipeline on it. A rock-crushing plant was built at the canyon's rim to avoid the need to carry gravel up the steep grade, but problems still persisted. Not even bulldozers could traverse the grade without a team of two helping each up the grade in turn. A bulldozer had to be modified to carry 80-foot (20.4-meter) sections of pipe up the grade, but even then, most of the sections and equipment had to be lifted by helicopter to the canyon rim. Similar techniques had to be used at nearby Thomson Pass, and both sections required the entire 1976 construction season to complete.

=== Pump stations and marine terminal ===
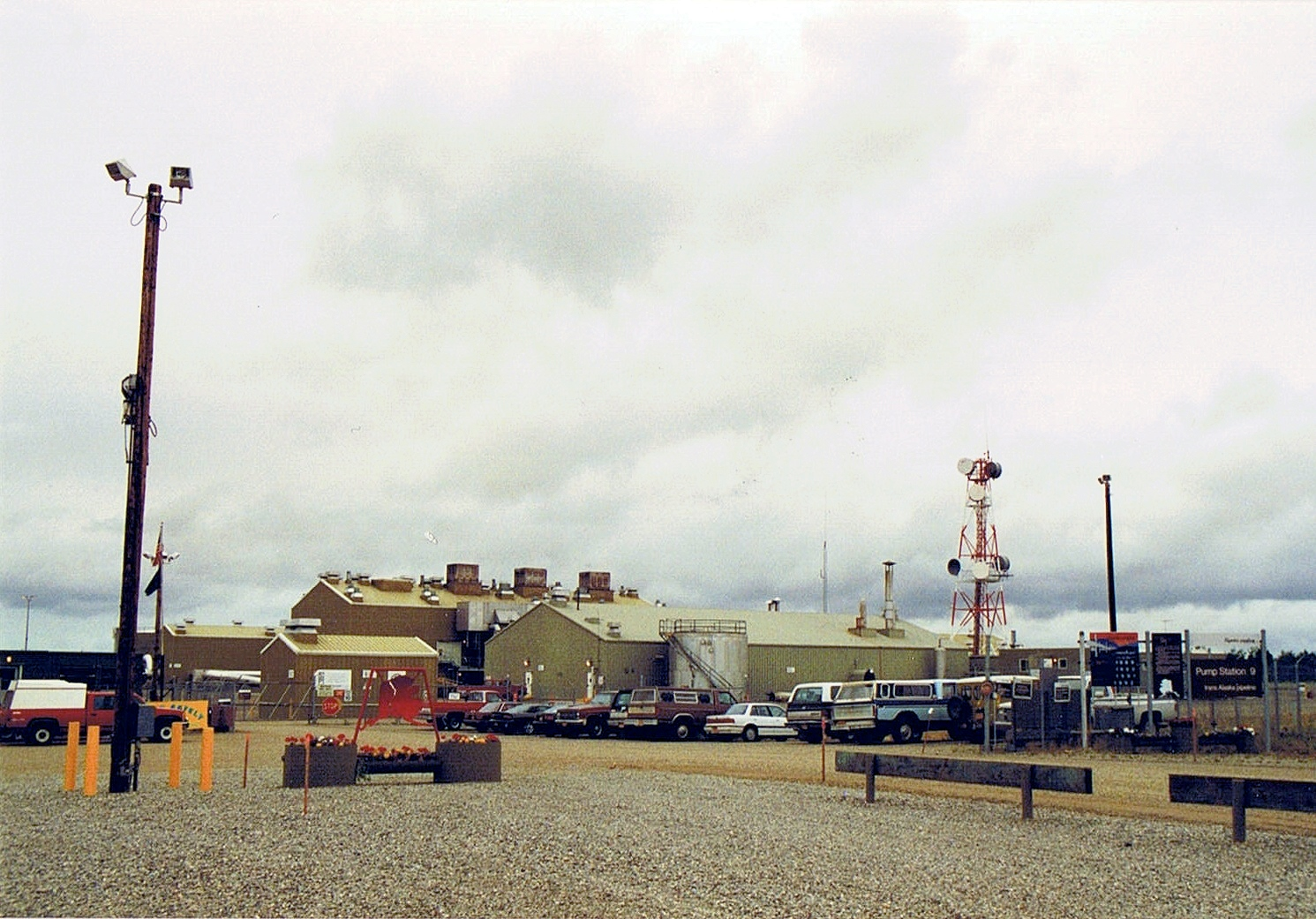
Pump Station 9 as seen in 1994.

Work at the pump stations and marine terminal, which had not stopped during the winter, continued throughout the 1976 construction season. Pump Station 6, just south of the Yukon River, had to be redesigned after excavation revealed permafrost below the site. Five pump stations needed at startup (when throughput was lower) received their pumps, turbines, and piping. As they were completed, the pump stations received hydrostatic testing, in which portions of pipe were filled with water and subjected to pressures in excess of the eventual operating conditions. Following this testing, the initial five pump stations were disconnected from the main pipeline and had oil run through them on a continuous loop. "It's very similar to your new automobile", one worker said. "You drive it around for ten days so that any components that are going to fail are given time to fail." Work on additional pump stations, which would not be needed until the pipeline was brought to full capacity, was not pressed forward.

At Valdez, construction was two-thirds complete by September as 4,200 workers hurried to complete the marine terminal. Because of loose soil found at the job site, enormous retaining walls had to be constructed to secure the ground below some of the 58 structures that were completed by the end of the year. During the first week of November, the first ship docked at the newly built Valdez quays. It was not a tanker but a ship bringing more construction material. In December, the first signal was sent from the Valdez operations center—where two new control computers had been installed—to Pump Station 2 on the North Slope.

Although the project made strides toward completion in 1976, it did not meet Moolin's goal of having all pipe installed, insulated, and tested by winter. The final section of main pipeline was welded in place on December 6, but not all of the pipeline was tested before winter set in. At the end of 1976, the project was 92 percent complete. The pipeline was 97.5 percent complete, the pump stations were 92 percent done, and the marine terminal stood at 83 percent. Because the terminal was the lagging portion of the project, its full work crew continued operations through the winter and into 1977.

== Finishing the line ==
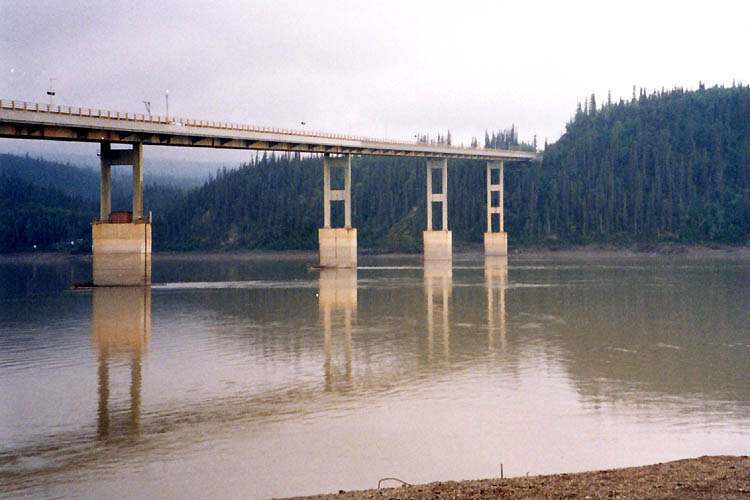
The E. L. Patton Yukon River Bridge was not completed until October 1979.

Few tasks were left to complete when the 1977 construction season began. Most of the pump stations had been turned over to operating personnel by construction workers, and environmental mitigation and cleanup was in full swing as Alyeska repaired tundra damage caused by construction. Associated-Green, which had performed its construction tasks well, was assigned the job of finishing the final touches on the main pipeline. The last 160 miles of hydrostatic testing were done, 33 remedial welds were completed, and 45 miles of pipe were insulated, among other tasks. Because the pace of construction was much slower than in 1976, fewer workers were needed. Fewer than 11,000 were employed at the peak of 1977 work, about half of 1976's total. On May 31, the final pipeline weld took place.

Additional tasks remained still to be completed, but the pipeline could be put into operation without them. The 2,290-foot (700 m) E. L. Patton Yukon River Bridge was not completed until October 1979; until then, traffic utilized a series of ferries across the river. Additional pump stations also were constructed between 1977 and 1980, as oil flow increased.

=== Camp cleanup ===
As part of the Trans-Alaska Pipeline Authorization Act, Alyeska was required to remove most traces of the 31 pipeline construction camps. Seven camps closed in November 1976, and six more closed before the 1977 construction season started. All told, 20 camps went up for sale. One was sold to the University of Alaska for use as an Arctic research facility, while another was converted for use as a truck stop and motel.

In addition to removing its camps, Alyeska also had to dispose of the heavy equipment used to build the pipeline. In January 1977, Alyeska listed more than 20,000 pieces of equipment for sale. The New York Times called the auction of surplus equipment "one of the biggest going-out-of-business sales in history."

== Turning on TAPS ==
In April 1977, Alyeska filed a notice that it intended to start filling the pipeline sometime between June 20 and July 1. Engineers had to face several problems when filling the pipeline. First was the need to balance temperatures: Filled by air, the steel pipeline was about 20 °F (−7 °C) degrees. The oil emerging from wells at Prudhoe Bay was more than 120 °F (49 °C) degrees, and there was a danger that if it was introduced before intermediate warming, the pipeline could crack because of thermal expansion. The second problem came when the pipeline needed to be purged of air in order to reduce the danger of fire or explosion. Usually, a pipeline is filled with water first, and the oil pushes the water ahead of it, purging the pipeline as it goes. In Alaska, there was a fear that the water would freeze in the pipeline, damaging it. This problem was solved when pressurized nitrogen was used instead of water.

On June 20, 1977, the first section of pipeline was pressurized with nitrogen, and oil was introduced behind it. Because of the cold temperature of the pipeline and the slow rate at which oil was introduced, it took 31 days for the first oil to travel from Prudhoe to Valdez. "As oil cools down, it becomes thicker", explained one worker. "Our oil at first had a viscosity very similar to asphalt." Another problem was faced when the oil traveled downslope from Atigun Pass. To avoid a situation where the oil front could gain momentum from the downhill slope and rapidly crash into a pipeline section or pump and damage it, regulator valves were used to slow the rate at which the nitrogen ahead of the oil could move. This procedure was used at the other downhill slopes at startup.

As the oil advanced through the pipeline, it was paced by a series of inspectors who traveled along the pipeline route to ensure the weight of the oil did not cause the pipeline to settle or create problems on bridges as the unbalanced weight of the oil front passed over them. This first inspection crew was followed by a second, and others patrolled the pipeline regularly as the oil front passed down the line. The first oil arrived in Valdez on July 28, 1977, at 11:02 p.m. The oil was only 45 °F (7 °C), but it gradually warmed as the system reached a thermal equilibrium. After the initial startup, the pipeline was intended to run continuously. Said an engineer: "We start up this pipeline once ... It will stay onstream then forever ... 'forever' being the life of the oil field."

The startup was not without incident. On July 4, a nitrogen leak was detected at milepost 489.2. The flow of oil stopped for three days as workers repaired a pipe elbow that cracked because of the temperature difference between the pipe and the supercooled nitrogen. On July 8, oil flowed through a shut-off pump at Pump Station 8 as workers replaced a strainer. The resulting spray mixed with ambient air and was ignited by a stray spark. One worker was killed and five others were injured in the resulting explosion, which also shut down the station until March 1978. On July 19, a heavy equipment accident caused a pipeline break that leaked 1,800 barrels per day (290 m^{3}/d) of oil.

The startup process and construction as a whole came to an end on August 1, 1977, when the tanker ARCO Juneau sailed out of Valdez with the first load of oil from the Trans-Alaska Pipeline System.

== Cost ==
When the TAPS group initially proposed the pipeline in 1969, the proposed cost was $900 million, and the pipeline would be completed by 1972. By January 1970, the projected cost had risen from $900 million to $2 billion. In October 1973, Alyeska further refined its figures and anticipated a cost of between $3.1 billion and $3.5 billion, with the potential for a billion more. One year later, Alyeska released its most detailed cost estimate to that point: $5.982 billion. By June 1975, that figure had again risen to $6.4 billion. At the time, it was estimated that $3 billion of the cost rise to that point was due to inflation, while another $2 billion was due to environmental costs. In July 1976, amid the second year of construction, the project's cost was raised to $7.7 billion. The increase, Alyeska reported, was due to material and freight costs, repairs needed to poorly built sections of pipeline, and contingency estimates.

The final construction cost was tallied at $8 billion, but this figure does not include interest on loans or the cost of improvements and repairs after 1977. The Valdez Marine Terminal alone cost $1.4 billion. The percentage of the pipeline owned by various companies has changed over time, but as of 2009, the primary owner was BP, which controls 46.93 percent of the pipeline. Second is ConocoPhillips Transportation Alaska Inc. with 28.29 percent, followed in order by ExxonMobil (20.34 percent), Koch Alaska Pipeline Company (3.08 percent), and Unocal Pipeline Company (1.36 percent).

The pipeline also has had a human toll. Thirty-two Alyeska or contract workers were killed during the construction project. That figure does not include common carrier fatalities. Since the pipeline began operating in 1977, 10 people have been killed while working for Alyeska or one of its contractors.

== Additional sources ==
- Allen, Lawrence J. The Trans-Alaska Pipeline. Vol 1: The Beginning. Vol 2: South to Valdez. Seattle; Scribe Publishing Co. 1975 and 1976.
- Alyeska Pipeline Service Co. Alyeska: A 30-Year Journey. Alyeska Pipeline Service Co., 2007.
- Dobler, Bruce. The Last Rush North. Boston; Little, Brown and Co., 1976.
- Fineberg, Richard A. A Pipeline in Peril: A Status Report on the Trans-Alaska Pipeline. Ester, Alaska; Alaska Forum for Environmental Responsibility, 1996.
- Hanrahan, John and Gruenstein, Peter. Lost Frontier: The Marketing of Alaska. New York; W.W. Norton, 1977.
- Kruse, John A. Fairbanks Community Survey. Fairbanks; Institute of Social and Economic Research, 1976.
- Lenzner, Terry F. The Management, Planning and Construction of the Trans-Alaska Pipeline System. Washington, D.C.; Report to the Alaska Pipeline Commission.
- McGinniss, Joe. Going to Extremes. New York; Alfred A. Knopf, 1980.
- McPhee, John. Coming Into the Country. New York: Farrar, Straus and Giroux, 1976.
- Romer, John and Elizabeth. The Seven Wonders of the World: A History of the Modern Imagination. New York; Henry Holt and Co., 1995.

=== Video ===
- Armstrong, John. Pipeline Alaska. Pelican Films, 1977.
- Davis, Mark. The American Experience: The Alaska Pipeline. PBS, Season 18, Episode 11. April 24, 2006.
- World's Toughest Fixes: Alaska Oil Pipeline. National Geographic Channel. Season 2, Episode 10. August 20, 2009.
