= James W. Dalton =

American mining engineer

- Born: 1913
- Died: May 8, 1977 (aged 63–64); Fairbanks, Alaska, U.S.
- Education: University of Alaska Fairbanks
- Occupation: Engineer
- Years active: 1931–1975

James W. Dalton (1913 – May 8, 1977) was an American engineer who was instrumental in the prospecting of the gas and oil fields in Alaska North Slope.

== Life and activities ==
Little is known about his life and activities. James W. Dalton's father was John "Jack" Dalton who in 1880 migrated from Canada to Alaska. There, father John was responsible for the construction of the toll-trail Dalton Trail.

James W. Dalton contributed to the reconstruction of the Tanana Valley Railroad. Dalton graduated from the University of Alaska Fairbanks as a mining engineer in 1937. During 1953, he discovered substantial gas- and oilfields of "high quality" in the North Slope which resulted in an extensive report published in June, 1954. Around the region of Prudhoe Bay further prospecting found the largest oil fields of the US.

== Honors ==
In his honor, in 1979 the Government of Alaska named Alaska Route 11 (originally named as “haul road”) the Dalton Highway and, alongside the highway, the James Dalton Mountain (7,100 ft.), as a part of the Endicott Mountains, after him.
