= Dalton Highway =

Highway in Alaska

Alaska Route 11
- Dalton Highway; North Slope Haul Road
- Dalton Highway highlighted in red

Route information
- Maintained by Alaska DOT&PF
- Length: 414 mi (666 km)
- Existed: 1974–present

Major junctions
- South end: AK-2 (Elliot Highway) near Livengood
- North end: East Lake Colleen Drive in Deadhorse

Location
- Country: United States
- State: Alaska
- Boroughs: Unorganized, North Slope

Highway system
- Alaska Routes; Interstate; Scenic Byways
← AK-10	→ AK-98

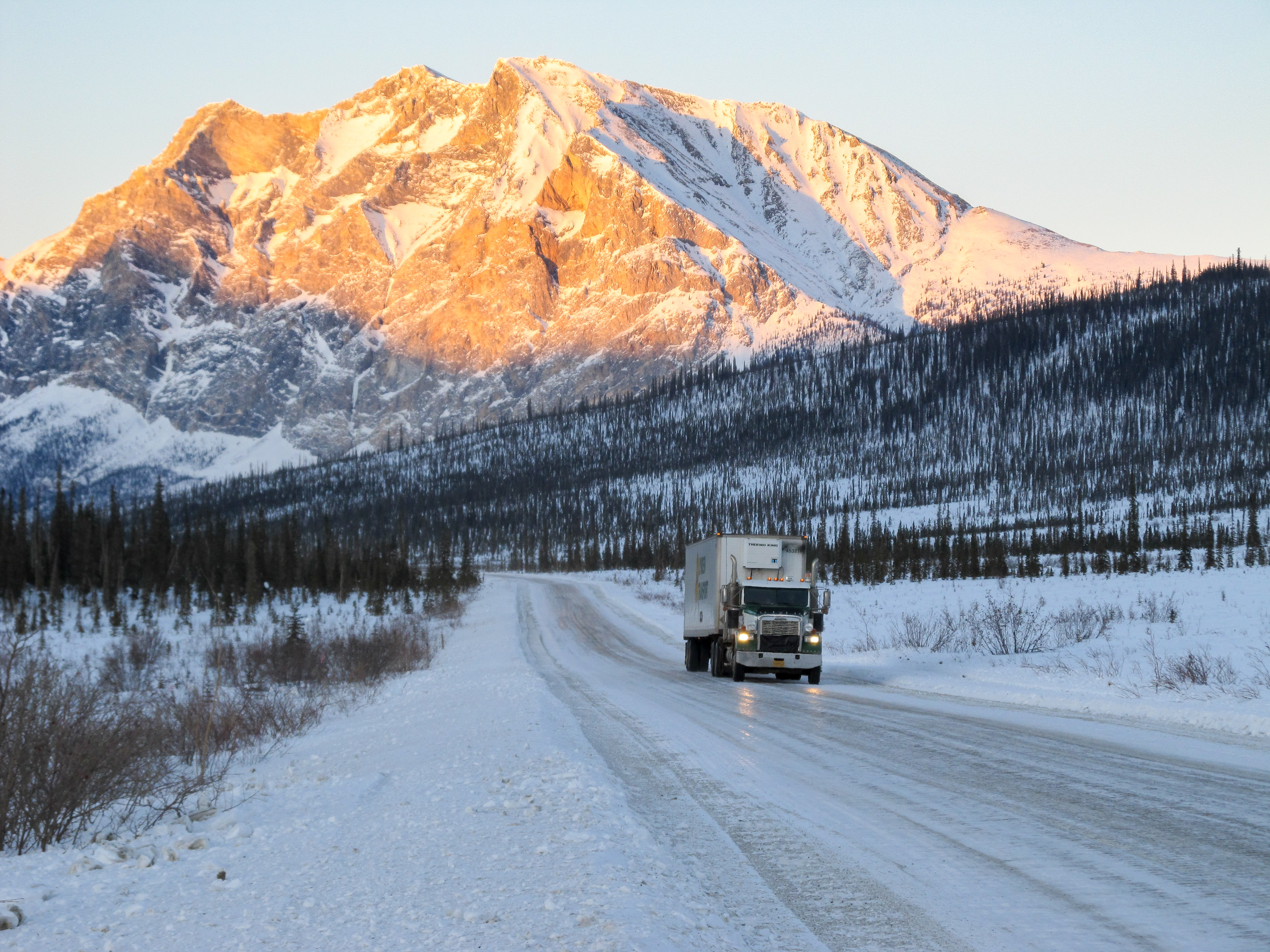
Sukakpak Mountain is a landmark at MP 203 Dalton Highway

The James W. Dalton Highway, usually referred to as the Dalton Highway (and signed as Alaska Route 11), is a 414-mile (666 km) road in Alaska. It begins at the Elliott Highway, north of Fairbanks, and ends at Deadhorse (an unincorporated community within the CDP of Prudhoe Bay) near the Arctic Ocean and the Prudhoe Bay Oil Fields. Once called the North Slope Haul Road (a name by which it is still sometimes known), it was built as a supply road to support the Trans-Alaska Pipeline System in 1974. It is named after James W. Dalton, a lifelong Alaskan and an engineer who supervised construction of the Distant Early Warning Line in Alaska and, as an expert in Arctic engineering, he served as a consultant in early oil exploration in northern Alaska. It is also the subject of the second episode of America's Toughest Jobs, seasons 3 and 4 of Ice Road Truckers and the first episode of the BBC's World's Most Dangerous Roads. Most of the Dalton Highway is unpaved, with occasional pavement along the route.

== History ==
In 1966, Governor Walter J. Hickel opened the North Slope to oil extraction. To improve access to the oil fields, a 400-mile (640 km) winter road was planned between Livengood and Prudhoe Bay. Construction started in November 1968, and the "Walter J. Hickel Highway" was completed by March 1969. Due to poor engineering, the construction of the road exposed the underlying permafrost to thawing, and the road was abandoned by April of that year. Maintenance was not performed as the route was farther west than the planned Trans-Alaska Pipeline System.

Following the failure of the Hickel Highway, oil companies still needed a route to the North Slope. The Alyeska Pipeline Service Company funded what would be the first stretch of the Dalton Highway from Livengood to the Yukon River in 1969.

Delays to the construction of the Trans-Alaska Pipeline System, and therefore the road, meant that work on it did not resume until April 29, 1974. Within 5 months, 390 miles (630 km) of the road were built and construction was finished. The pipeline would not be completed until 1977. It was initially known as the "Wales Highway".

In 1979, Alyeska turned over control of the road to the state of Alaska, who gave it the official name of "James W. Dalton Highway", named after the prospector of the North Slope, James W. Dalton. In 1981, the highway was opened to the public up to Disaster Creek at mile 211. Tourists began to travel north of Disaster Creek on June 4, 1987, after Royal Hyway Tours received the first permit to operate tour buses to Deadhorse.

In April 1991, Governor Hickel (serving a second term decades after his first) announced that he would open the entire highway to the public. The North Slope Borough government and the Tanana Chiefs Conference successfully sued to prevent the opening, arguing that the highway was unsafe as there were no facilities between Prudhoe Bay and Coldfoot, and that unrestricted traffic would harm the environment and open up possibilities for caribou and moose poaching. Between 1991 and 1993, the federal Bureau of Land Management (which owned the land surrounding the state-owned highway on either side) built new facilities for the permitted tour buses to use, and unauthorized use of the highway by drivers without permits increased significantly. The Alaska Supreme Court overruled the 1991 decision in 1993, ordering the state to remove the permit requirement. The permit system was eliminated and the full length of the highway was opened to the general public on December 2, 1994.

== Route description ==
The highway, which directly parallels the pipeline, is one of the most isolated roads in the United States. There are only three towns along the route: Coldfoot (pop. 34) at Mile 175, Wiseman (pop. 12) at Mile 188, and Deadhorse (25 permanent residents, 3,500–5,000 or more seasonal residents depending on oil production) at the end of the highway at Mile 414. Fuel is available at the E. L. Patton Yukon River Bridge (Mile 56), as well as Coldfoot and Deadhorse. Two other settlements, Prospect Creek and Galbraith Lake, are uninhabited except for campers and other short-term residents.

Despite its remoteness, the Dalton Highway carries a good amount of truck traffic through to Prudhoe Bay: about 160 trucks daily in the summer months and 250 trucks daily in the winter.

As of July 2013, 129 miles (208 km) of the highway are paved, in several sections, between the following mileages: 19 and 24; 37 and 50; 91 and 111; 113 and 197; 257 and 261; 344 and 352; and 356 and 361.

Truckers on the Dalton have given their own names to its various features, including: Taps, The Shelf, Franklin Bluffs, Oil Spill Hill, Beaver Slide, Surprise Rise, Sand Hill, Ice Cut, Gobbler's Knob, Finger Mountain, Oh Shit Corner, and the Roller Coaster. The road reaches its highest elevation as it crosses the Brooks Range at Atigun Pass at 4,739 feet (1,444 m).

The highway is the featured road on the second (episode 7), third, fourth, fifth and sixth seasons of the History reality television series Ice Road Truckers, which aired May 31, 2009, to November 9, 2017. It is also the subject of the second episode of America's Toughest Jobs and the first episode of the BBC's World's Most Dangerous Roads featuring Charley Boorman and Sue Perkins. Polar bears are known to traverse the Arctic region of Alaska and can be seen wandering the outskirts of Deadhorse at the terminus of the Dalton Highway.

Floodings of the Sagavanirktok River, combined with melting of nearby ice roads under warmer climatic conditions have forced weeks-long closures of the road and the need for significant repairs, costing several million US dollars.

In 2018, a 4,000-foot (1,200 m) section of the Dalton was moved to avoid a debris flow known as "the blob." A roughly 1 mile (1.6 km) long lobe of dirt, ice, and trees, the blob threatened to bulldoze the section of the road 200 miles (320 km) north of Fairbanks in the next three or four years at a speed of 15 feet (4.6 m) per year. It will likely have to be moved again in the next 20 years before the blob can threaten it again. Truckers were directed to a new gravel road that avoided the landslide.

== In Popular Culture ==
The Dalton Highway is the main subject of the second episode of America's Toughest Jobs, along with seasons 3 and 4 of Ice Road Truckers and the first episode of the BBC's World's Most Dangerous Roads.

== Major intersections and other features ==
Borough	Location	mi	km	Destinations	Notes
Unorganized	Livengood	0	0.0	AK-2 (Elliott Highway) – Manley Hot Springs, Fairbanks	Southern terminus
Unorganized	Hess Creek	21	34	Hess Creek Overlook & Rest Area	
Unorganized	Yukon River	56	90	E. L. Patton Yukon River Bridge	Crossing over the Yukon River
Unorganized		115	185	Arctic Circle Wayside Rest Area	A short side road leads to viewing deck with interpretive displays
Unorganized		126	203	Oh Shit Corner	
Unorganized	Prospect Creek	135	217	Access road to Prospect Creek Airport	Site of the lowest recorded temperature in the United States
Unorganized	Grayling Lake	150	240	Grayling Lake Wayside Rest Area	
Unorganized	Coldfoot	175	282	Coldfoot Road	To Coldfoot Visitor Center
Unorganized	Coldfoot	175	282	Airport Road	To Coldfoot Airport and Coldfoot Post Office
Unorganized	Wiseman	189	304	Road to Wiseman	
North Slope		244	393	Continental Divide / Atigun Pass	The highest-altitude point on the road (elevation 4,739 feet (1,444 m))
North Slope	Galbraith Lake	275	443	Galbraith Airport Road	To Galbraith Lake Airport
North Slope		348	560	Sagavanirktok River Overlook	
North Slope	Deadhorse	414	666	East Lake Colleen Drive	To Deadhorse Airport and Prudhoe Bay; Northern terminus; Northernmost part of the western hemisphere road network
1.000 mi = 1.609 km; 1.000 km = 0.621 mi

== Gallery ==
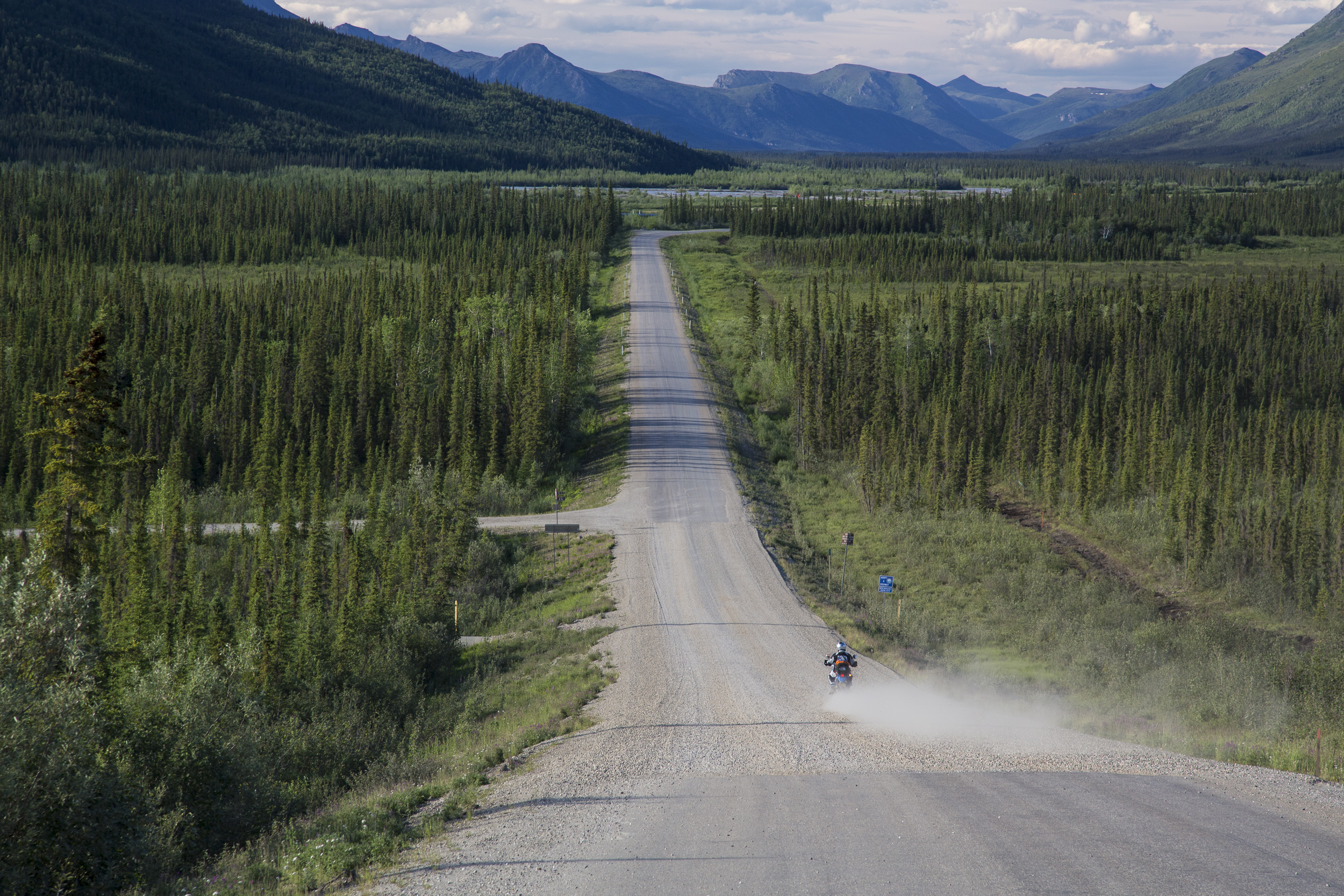
Dalton Highway south of the Continental Divide in the summer

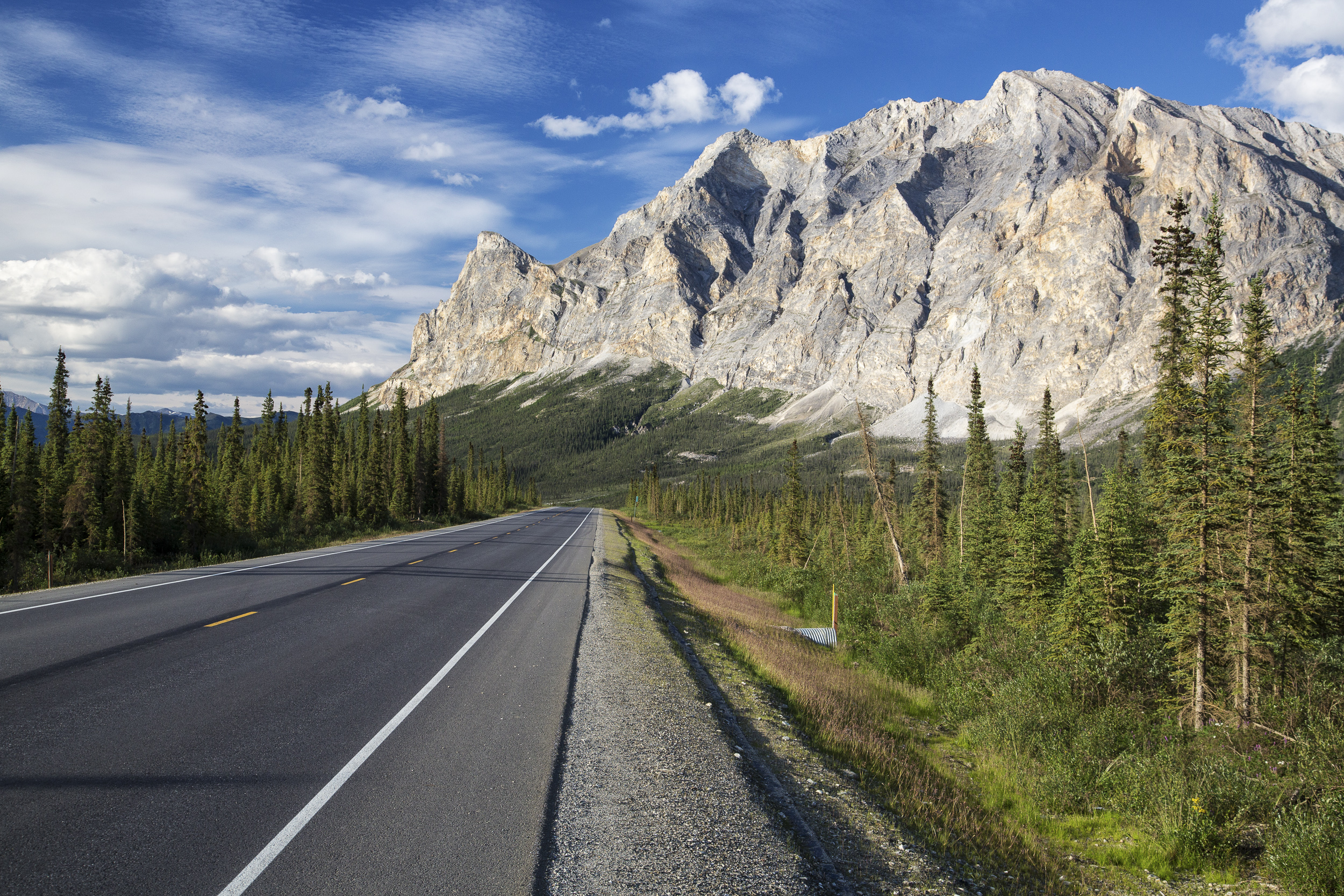
Dalton Highway passing Sukakpak Mountain in the summer

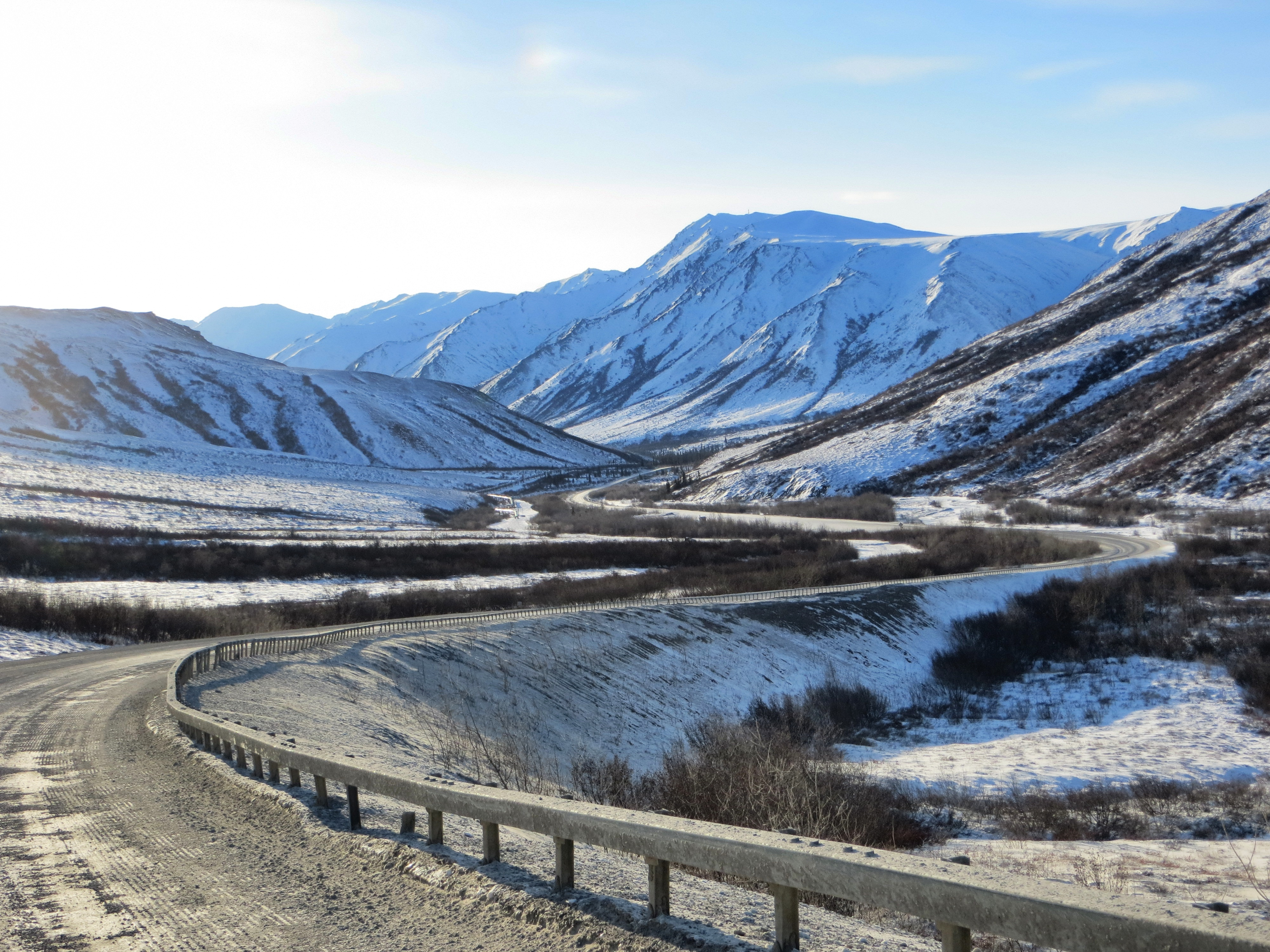
The Brooks Range south of the Continental Divide near Atigun Pass (6 March 2013)

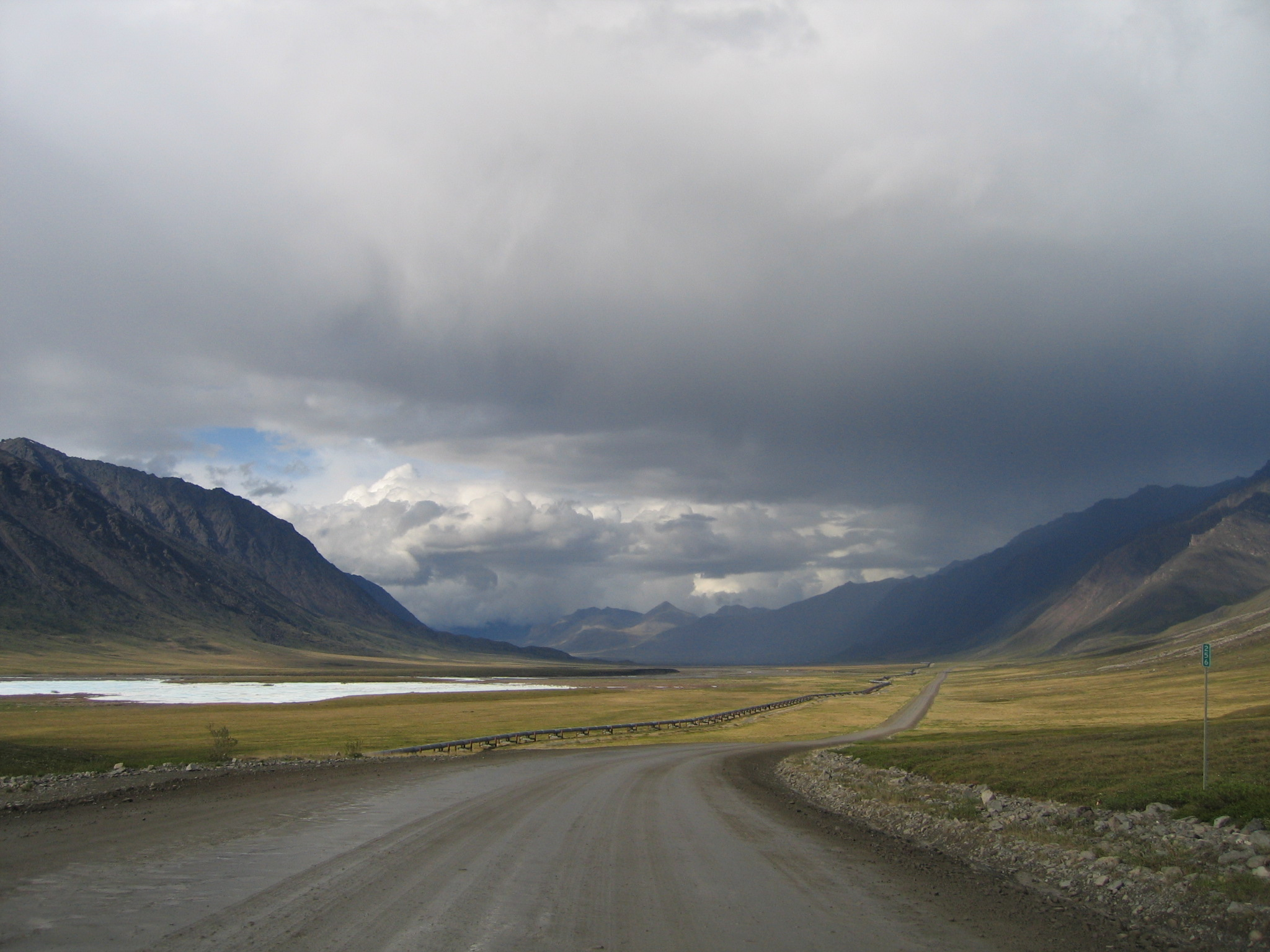
The Brooks Range north of the Continental Divide (Atigun Pass), mile 256

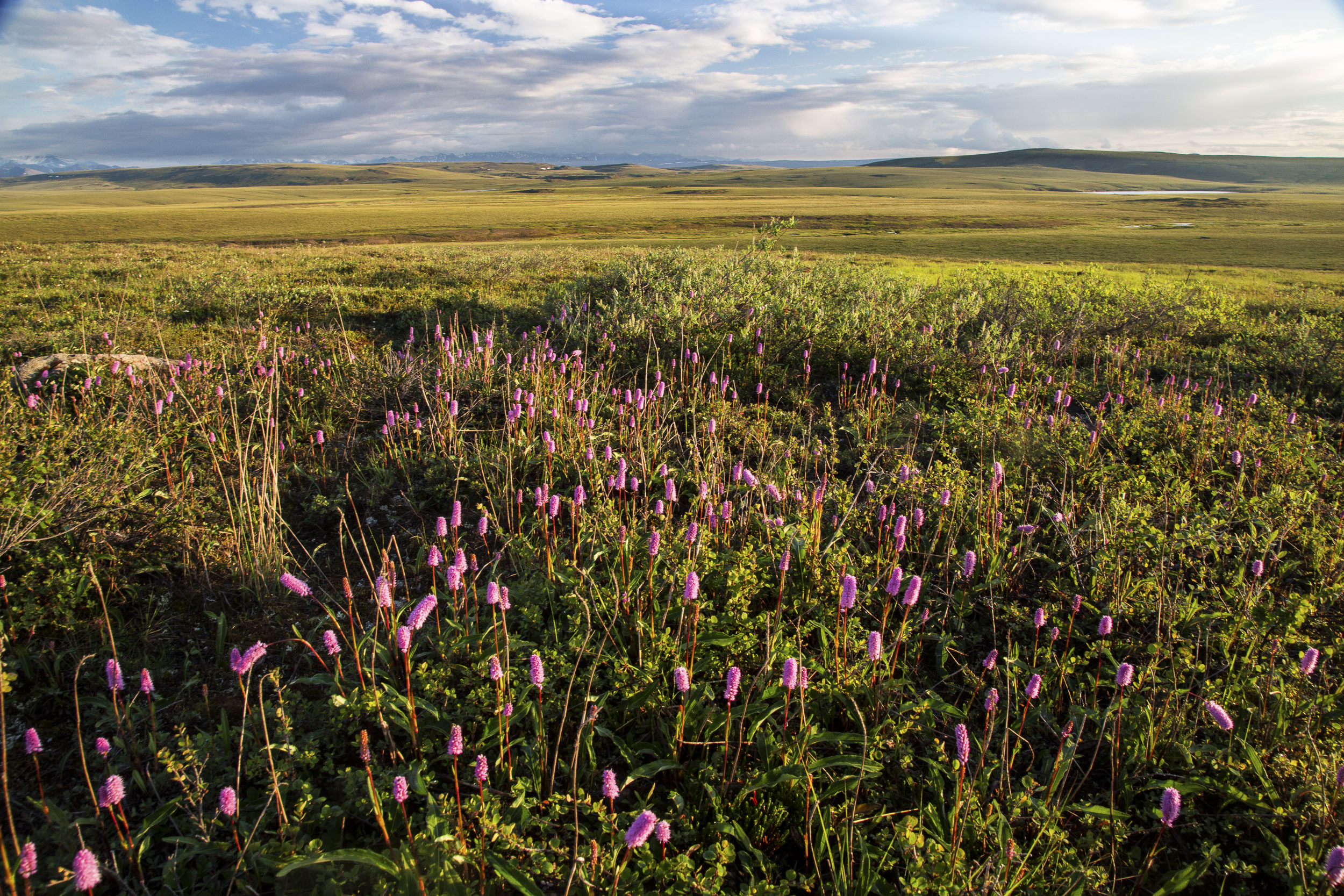
View of tundra in the summer from Dalton Highway, North Slope Borough, Alaska

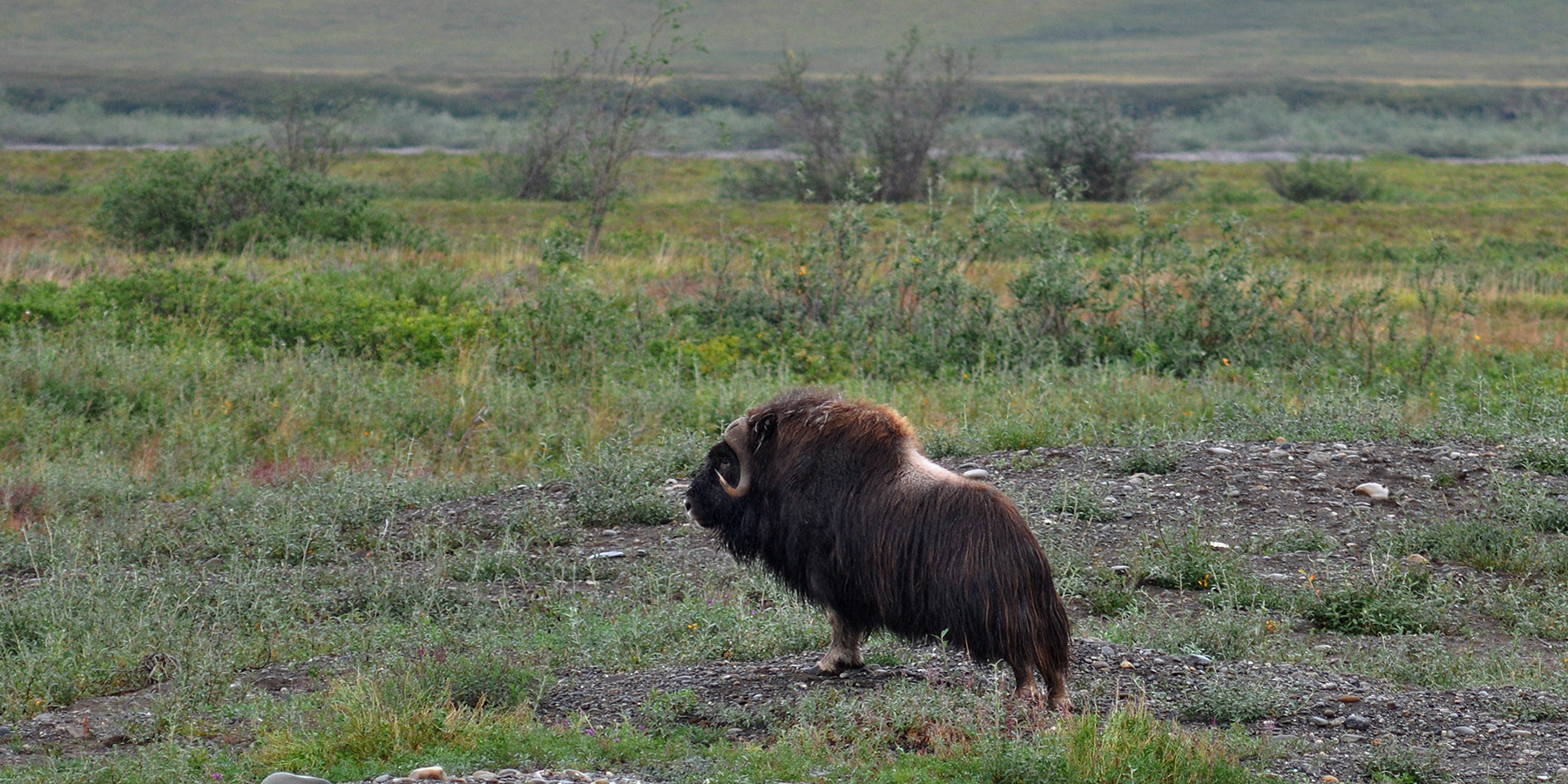
Muskox (Ovibos moschatus), Dalton Highway (Hwy 11) North Slope Borough, Alaska (10 August 2010)

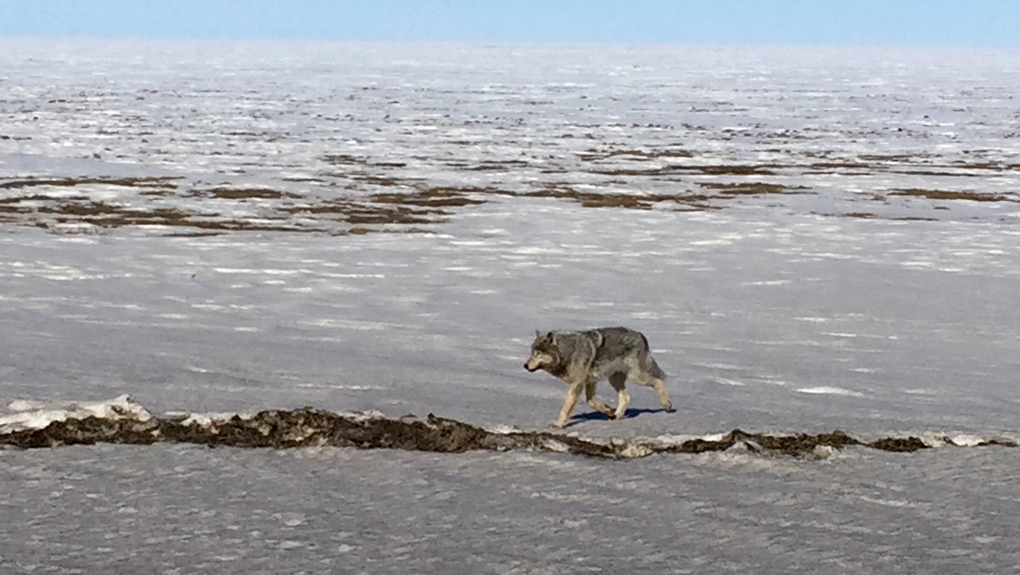
Wolf photographed from the Dalton Highway, North Slope Borough, Alaska (10 May 2016)

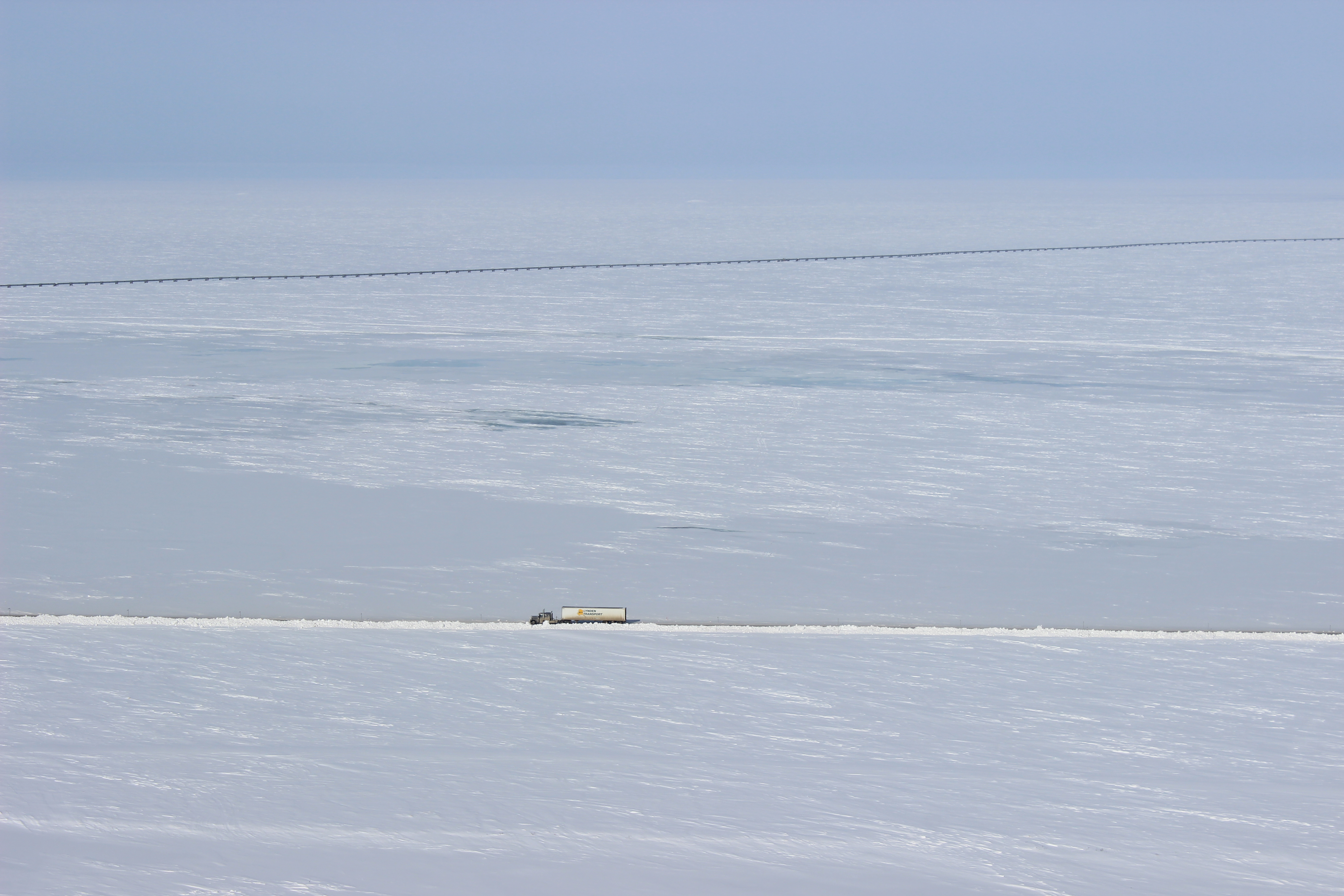
Aerial view of the highway with the Trans-Alaska Pipeline in the background (14 April 2015)

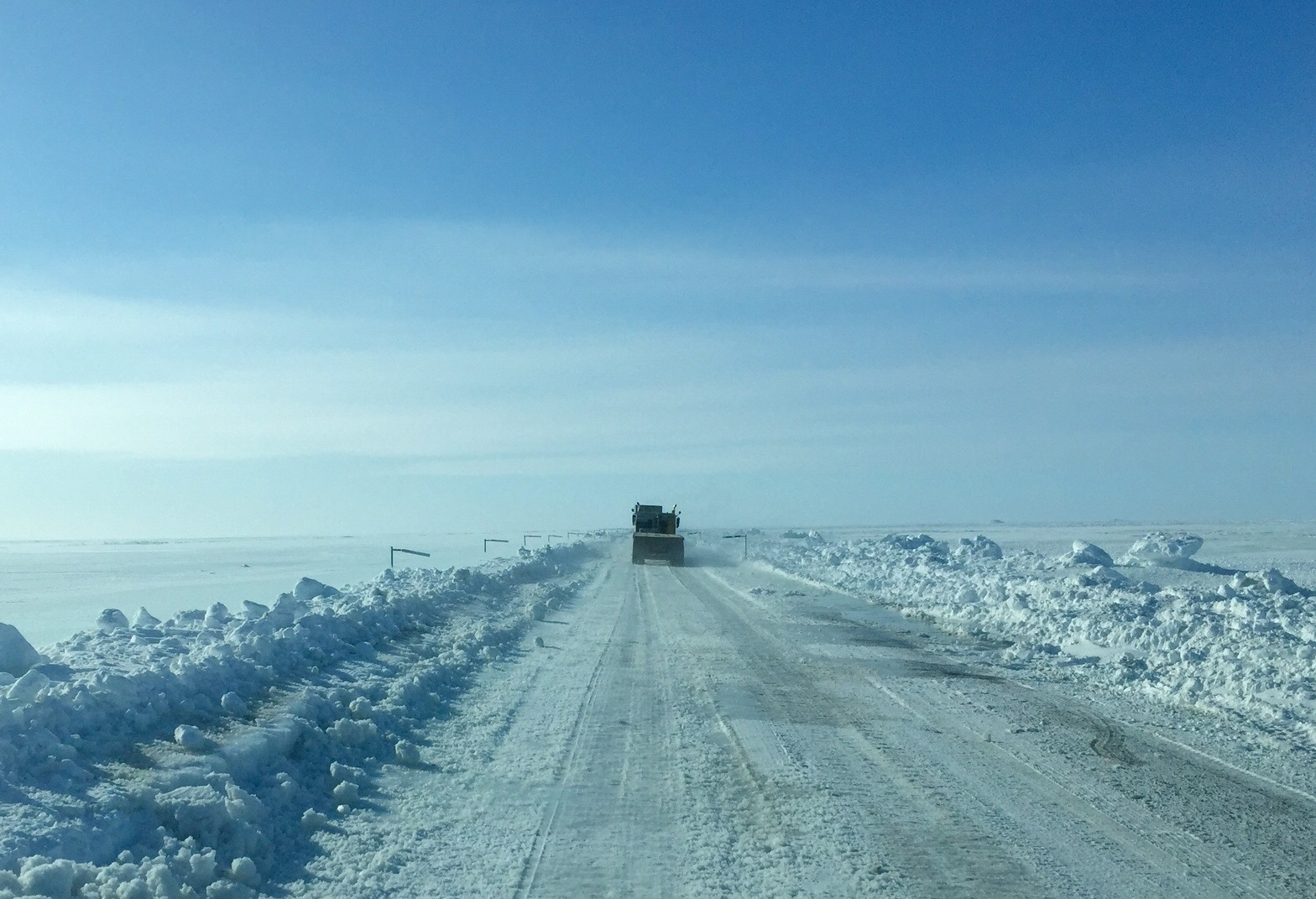
Highway about 10 miles south of Deadhorse, North Slope Borough, Alaska (5 April 2015)

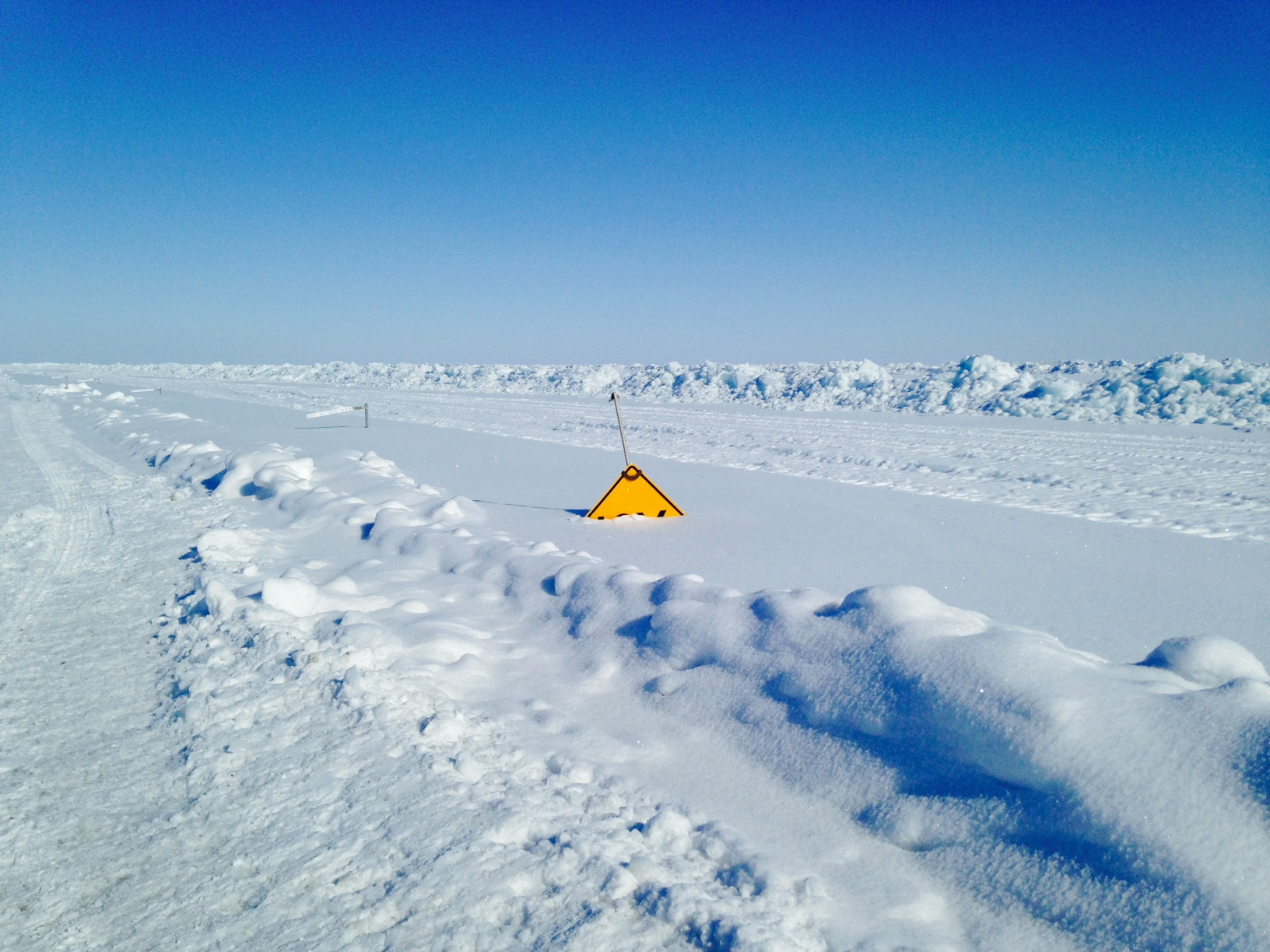
Highway sign in the snow, North Slope Borough, Alaska (17 April 2015)

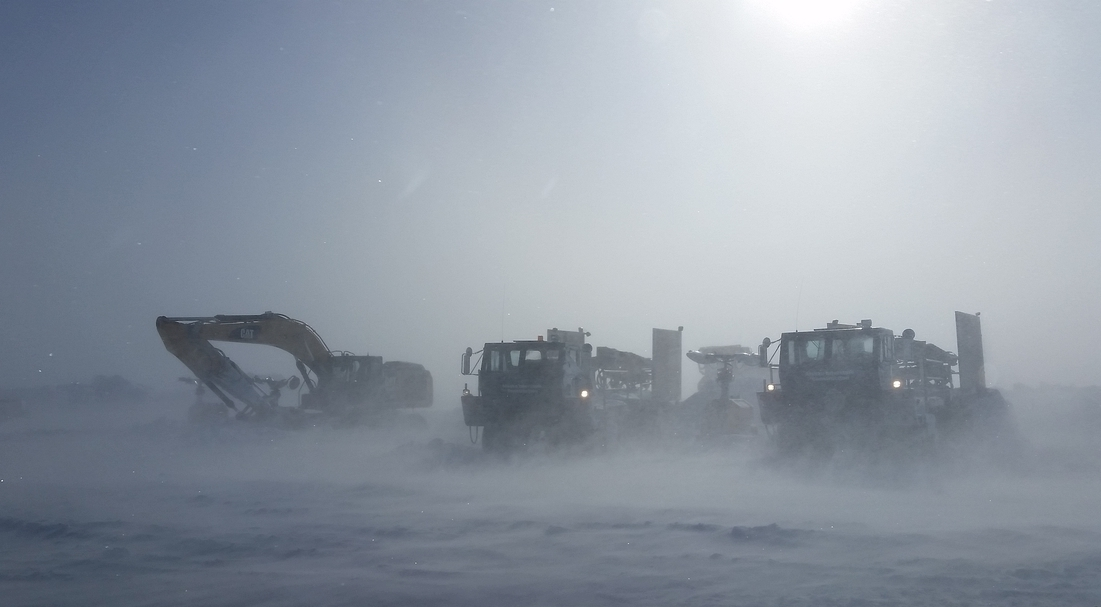
Winter conditions on the Dalton Highway (April 2016)

== See also ==
- List of Alaska Routes
- Dempster Highway - Only other all-purpose road to go past the Arctic Circle in North America
