= Frank Moolin Jr. =

Frank P. Moolin Jr.
- Born: 1934
- Died: 1982 (aged 47–48)
- Citizenship: American
- Education: University of Chicago
- Occupation: Civil engineer
- Known for: being senior engineer in charge of the construction of the Trans-Alaska Pipeline System

Frank P. Moolin Jr. (1934–1982) was the senior engineer in charge of the construction of the Trans-Alaska Pipeline System.

He graduated from the University of Chicago magna cum laude with an engineering degree.

Moolin worked on various projects, including a refinery in Singapore and San Francisco's Bay Area Rapid Transit system. After finishing work on the pipeline, Moolin started a construction consulting company. He also was chief executive officer for the conglomerate Alaska International Industries, and became a vice president of Western Airlines. He was awarded "Construction's Man of the Year" by Engineering News-Record magazine.

In 1982, he died of leukemia. Shortly before his death, he stated:

"Perhaps I am being immodest, but I believe that in my career, I have accomplished many things. And foremost among them is the successful construction of the Trans-Alaska Pipeline System. I am confident that history will place the TAPS project among the highest technological achievements of engineering and construction. We had a very tough job to do, and we did it well."
