= Sagavanirktok River =

River in Alaska, United States

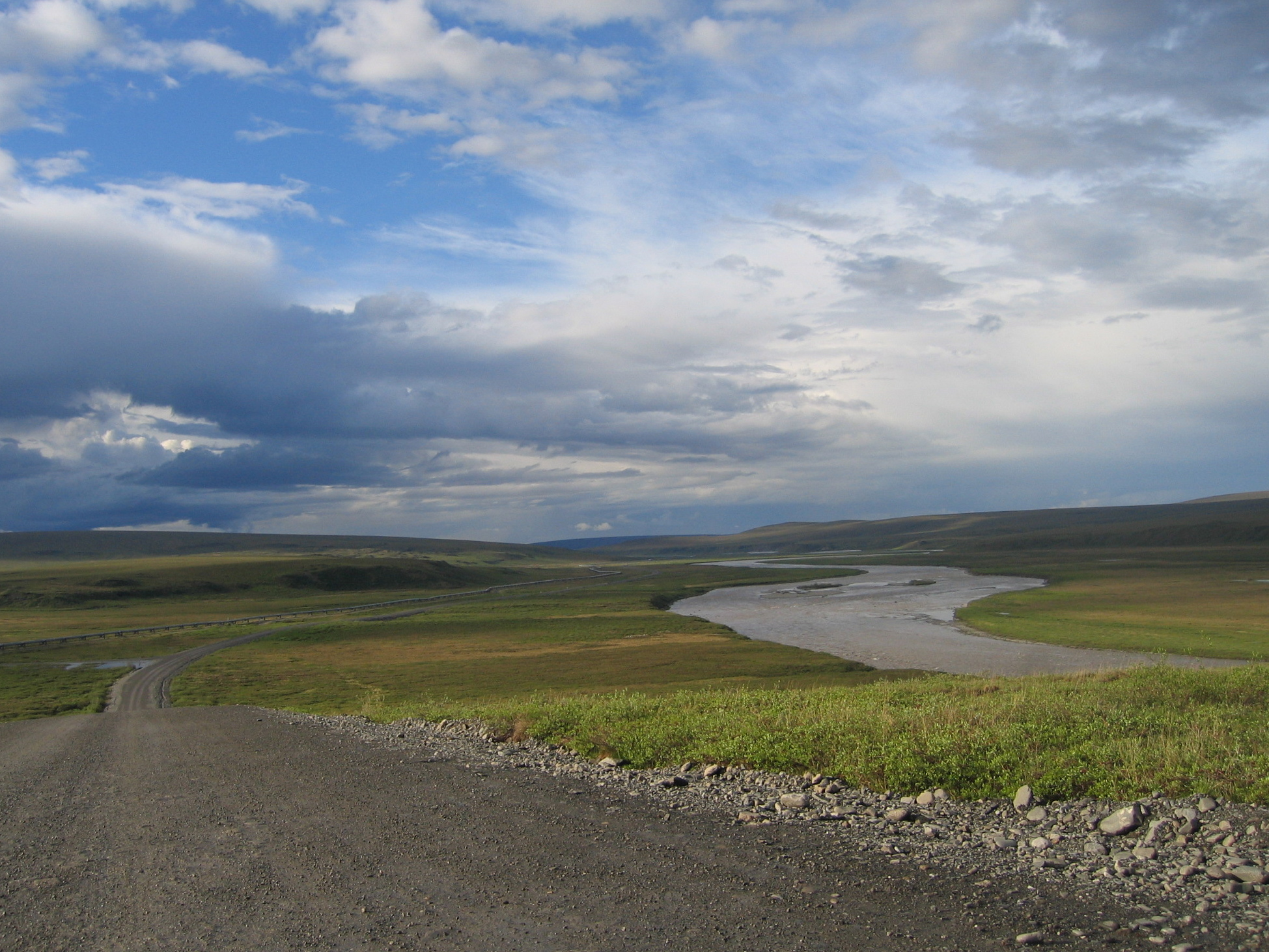
- Along the Dalton Highway

- Location of the mouth of the Sagavanirktok River in Alaska
- Native name: Saġvaaniqtuuq (Inupiaq)

Location
- Country: United States
- State: Alaska
- Borough: North Slope

Physical characteristics
- Source: Between the Endicott and Philip Smith Mountains
  - location: Brooks Range
  - coordinates: 68°09′48″N 148°55′53″W
  - elevation: 4,986 ft (1,520 m)
- Mouth: Slightly northeast of Prudhoe Bay
  - location: Beaufort Sea
  - coordinates: 70°19′15″N 148°02′10″W
  - elevation: 0 ft (0 m)
- Length: 180 mi (290 km)
- Basin size: 5,750 sq mi (14,900 km^{2})
- Discharge
  - average: 4,700 cu ft/s (130 m^{3}/s)

The Sagavanirktok River or Sag River (Iñupiaq: Saġvaaniqtuuq) is a stream in the North Slope Borough of the U.S. state of Alaska. It is about 180 miles (290 km) long and originates on the north slope of the Brooks Range, flowing north to the Beaufort Sea near Prudhoe Bay. The Trans-Alaska Pipeline System and Dalton Highway roughly parallel it from Atigun Pass to Deadhorse.

A glaciation happened approximately at the same time as the Illinoian Stage of central North America at the Sagavanirktok River.

== See also ==
- List of rivers of Alaska
