= United States temperature extremes =

Highest and lowest recorded temperatures in the United States

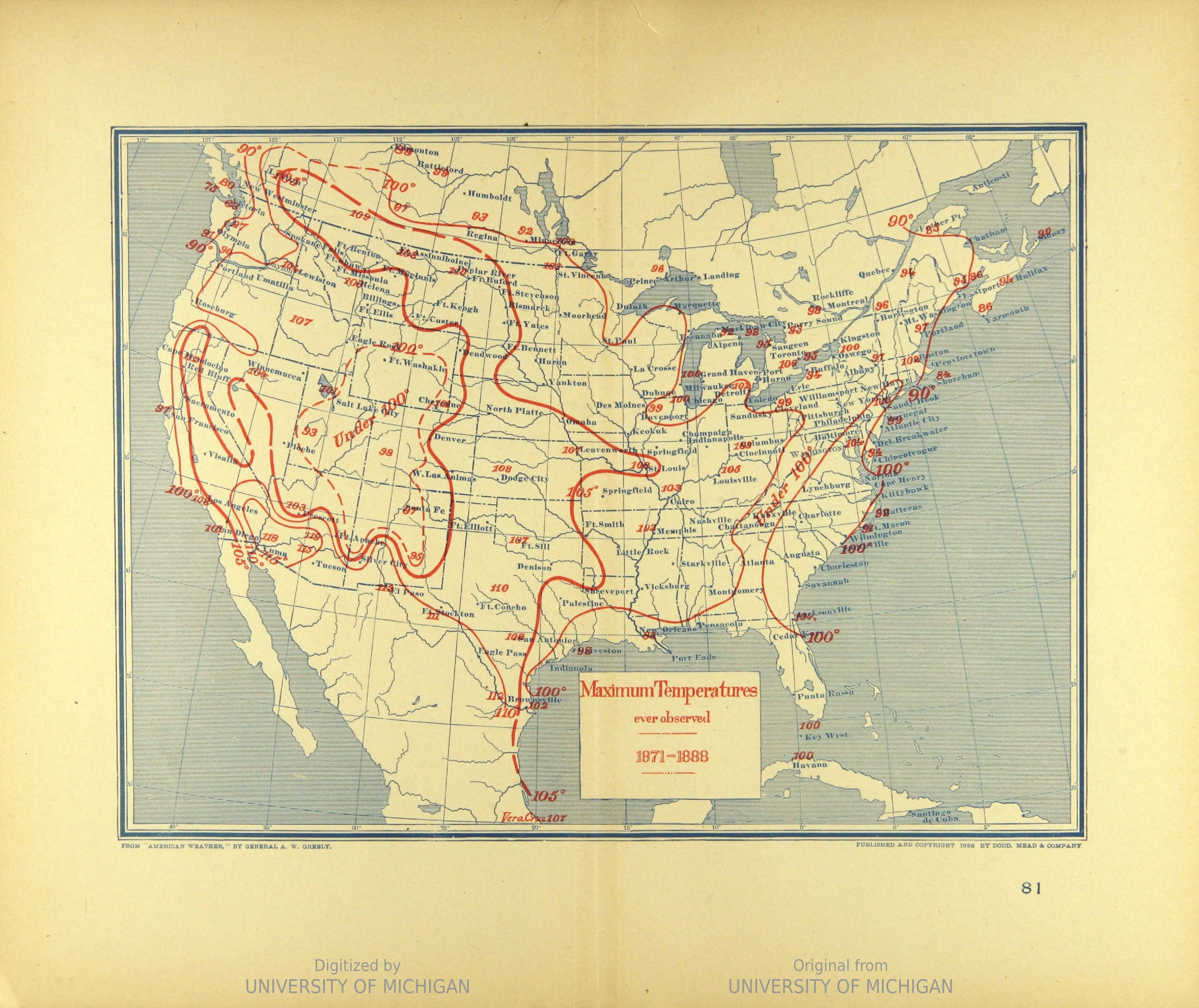
Maximum temperature map of the United States from 1871-1888

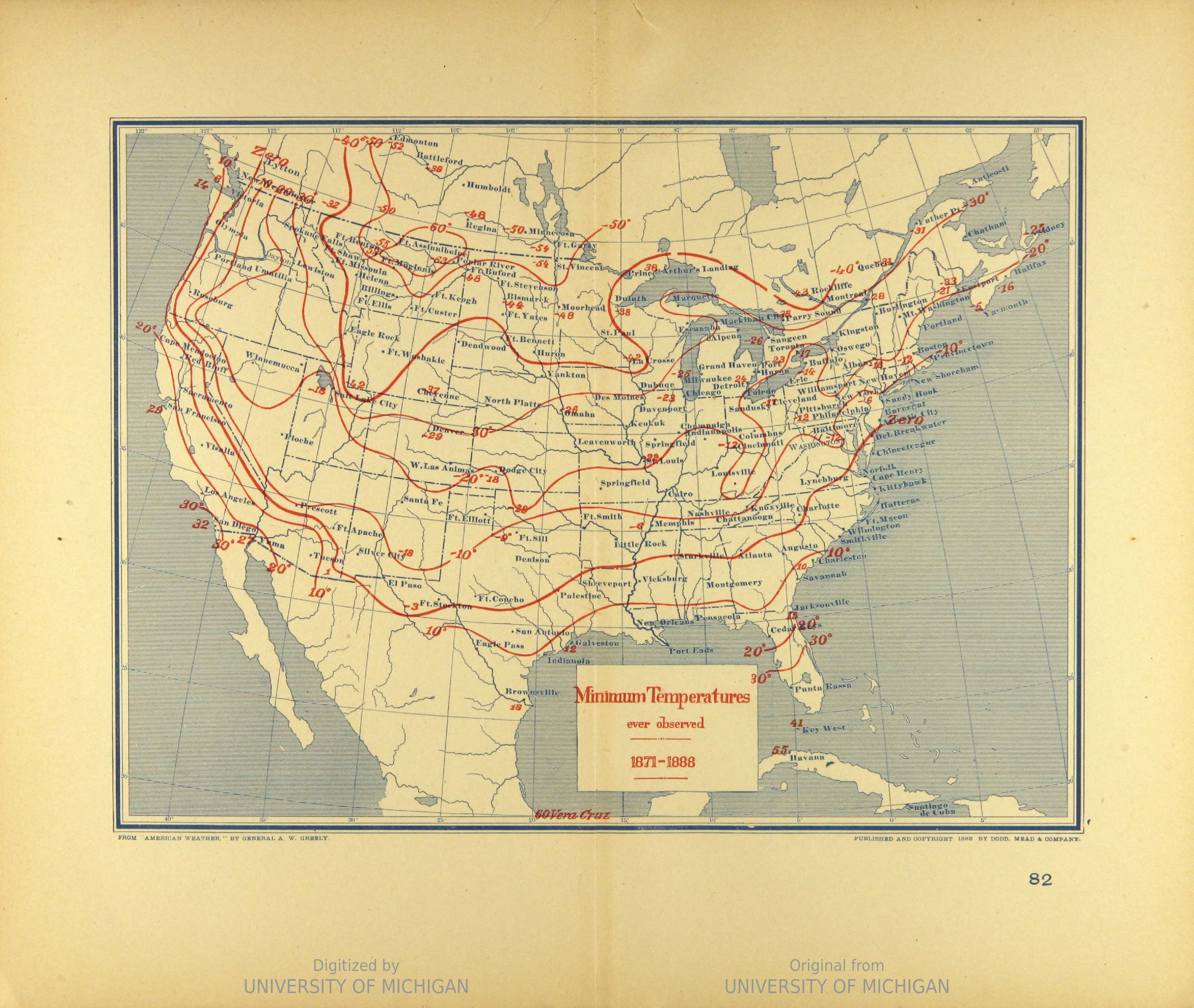
Minimum temperature map of the United States from 1871-1888

For the United States, the extremes are 134 °F (56.7 °C) in Death Valley, California in 1913 and −79.8 °F (−62.1 °C) recorded in Prospect Creek, Alaska in 1971. The Death Valley record is contested due to lack of corroborating evidence from other stations nearby. The next hottest temperature of 130°F (54.4°C) recorded at Furnace Creek on August 16 2020 and July 9 2021 is the highest uncontested, reliably measured temperature in the United States and on Earth.

The largest recorded temperature change in one place over a 24-hour period occurred on January 15, 1972 in Loma, Montana, when the temperature rose from −54 to 49 °F (−47.8 to 9.4 °C).

The most dramatic temperature changes occur in North American climates susceptible to Chinook winds. For example, the largest 2-minute temperature change of 49 °F (27.2 °C) occurred in Spearfish, South Dakota, a rise from −4 to 45 °F (−20.0 to 7.2 °C).

== U.S. Climate Diversity ==
The United States feature some of the most extreme temperatures anywhere in the world, driven by extreme geographic diversity. While the Death Valley/Furnace Creek record is the highest recorded temperature, the Prospect Creek minimum temperature record is reliably the fifth coldest recorded worldwide. Continental influences allow for extreme temperature swings, both diurnally and seasonally.

Further, the density of on the ground sensors compared to other regions allows for great capture of extreme events.

== Lack of extremes ==
Among the U.S. states, Hawaii has both the lowest state maximum of 98 °F (36.7 °C) and the highest state minimum of 12.0 °F (−11.1 °C). Tropical ocean island locations such as Hawaii often have the lowest recorded temperature ranges. Hawaii has a high mountain on which its lowest temperature is recorded. Flat tropical ocean islands have smaller ranges, sometimes with a difference of as little as Northern Mariana Islands which has 35 °F (19.4 °C) range, between 62 °F (16.7 °C) and 97 °F (36.1 °C).

== See also ==
- U.S. state temperature extremes
