= E. L. Patton Yukon River Bridge =

Girder bridge in Alaska, United States

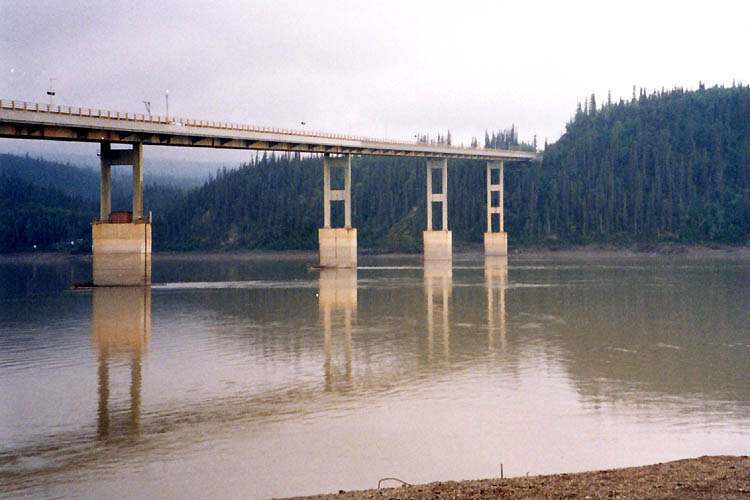
- Span from the northwest
- Coordinates: 65°52′29″N 149°42′38.5″W
- Carries: AK-11; Alaska Pipeline
- Crosses: Yukon River
- Locale: Yukon-Koyukuk Census Area, Alaska
- Official name: E. L. Patton Bridge
- Other name(s): Yukon River Bridge; Patton Bridge
- Owner: DOT&PF
- Maintained by: DOT&PF

Characteristics
- Total length: 2,295 feet (700 m)
- Width: 30 feet (9.1 m)

History
- Constructed by: Manson-Osberg-Ghemm
- Construction start: May 1974
- Opened: October 10, 1975

Location
- Interactive map of E. L. Patton Yukon River Bridge

The Yukon River Bridge, officially known as the E. L. Patton Bridge, is a girder bridge spanning the Yukon River in Yukon-Koyukuk Census Area, Alaska, United States. The bridge carries both the Dalton Highway and the Alaska Pipeline in connecting Fairbanks with Deadhorse near the Arctic Ocean and the Prudhoe Bay Oil Field. It is the only bridge crossing of the Yukon in Alaska.

== History ==
As part of construction of the Trans-Alaska Pipeline System, a permanent crossing of the Yukon River became necessary in order to complete the project. In December 1973, the state announced that it would begin accepting bids for the construction of the span. To be constructed as joint venture between the Alyeska Pipeline Service Company and the State of Alaska, the bridge was to be supported by tiers anchored to bedrock beneath the river. At its highest point, the span would rise approximately 200 feet (61 m) above the river with its length changing by nearly 2 feet (0.61 m) between the summer and winter months. A consortium called Manson-Osberg-Ghemm was selected to construct the bridge with a bid of $31 million to be complete by December 1975.

With construction commencing in May 1974, in the following August the project suffered its only major construction delay with the failure of a cofferdam. The cofferdam failed at its base where workers were working to set one of the concrete and steel bridge piers. The dams themselves had dimensions of 54 feet (16 m) wide by 38 feet (12 m) long with a depth of 37 feet (11 m).

Although still not yet complete at the time, the bridge celebrated its ceremonial ribbon-cutting on October 10, 1975. This allowed Alyeska to start using the span, thus eliminating the need to construct an ice bridge that winter to transport materials across the river. The bridge would remain under the control of Alyeska until the completion of the Alaska Pipeline, then control of both the bridge and the haul road was turned over to the state. The state issued its final use permit on October 30, 1975.

After both debate and litigation as to who would be allowed to use the haul road and bridge crossing, in October 1978 both were turned over to the state. In March 1982, the state officially named the bridge in honor of Edward Patton, former president of the Alyeska Pipeline Service Company during construction of the pipeline.

== Description ==
The bridge has a length of 2,295 feet (700 m) and a width of 30 feet (9.1 m). The driving surface of the span is of timber construction supported by a steel deck attached to a pair of steel box girders. The wooden deck has been replaced in 1981, 1992, 1999 and 2007.
