= Atigun Pass =

Mountain pass across the Brooks Range, Alaska

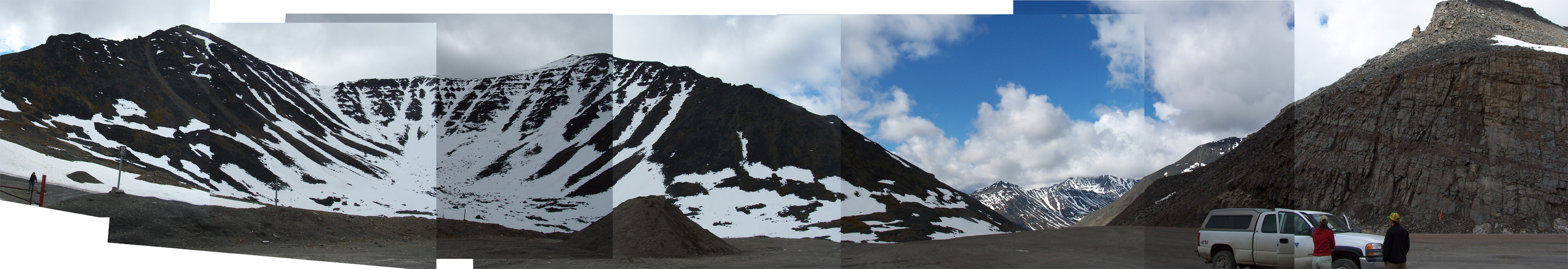
- Composite 240-degree view of Atigun Pass
- Interactive map of Atigun Pass
- Elevation: approx. 4700 ft. (1,444 m)
- Traversed by: Dalton Highway

Third Approach
- Location: North Slope Borough, Alaska, United States
- Range: Brooks Range
- Coordinates: 68°07′46″N 149°28′33″W

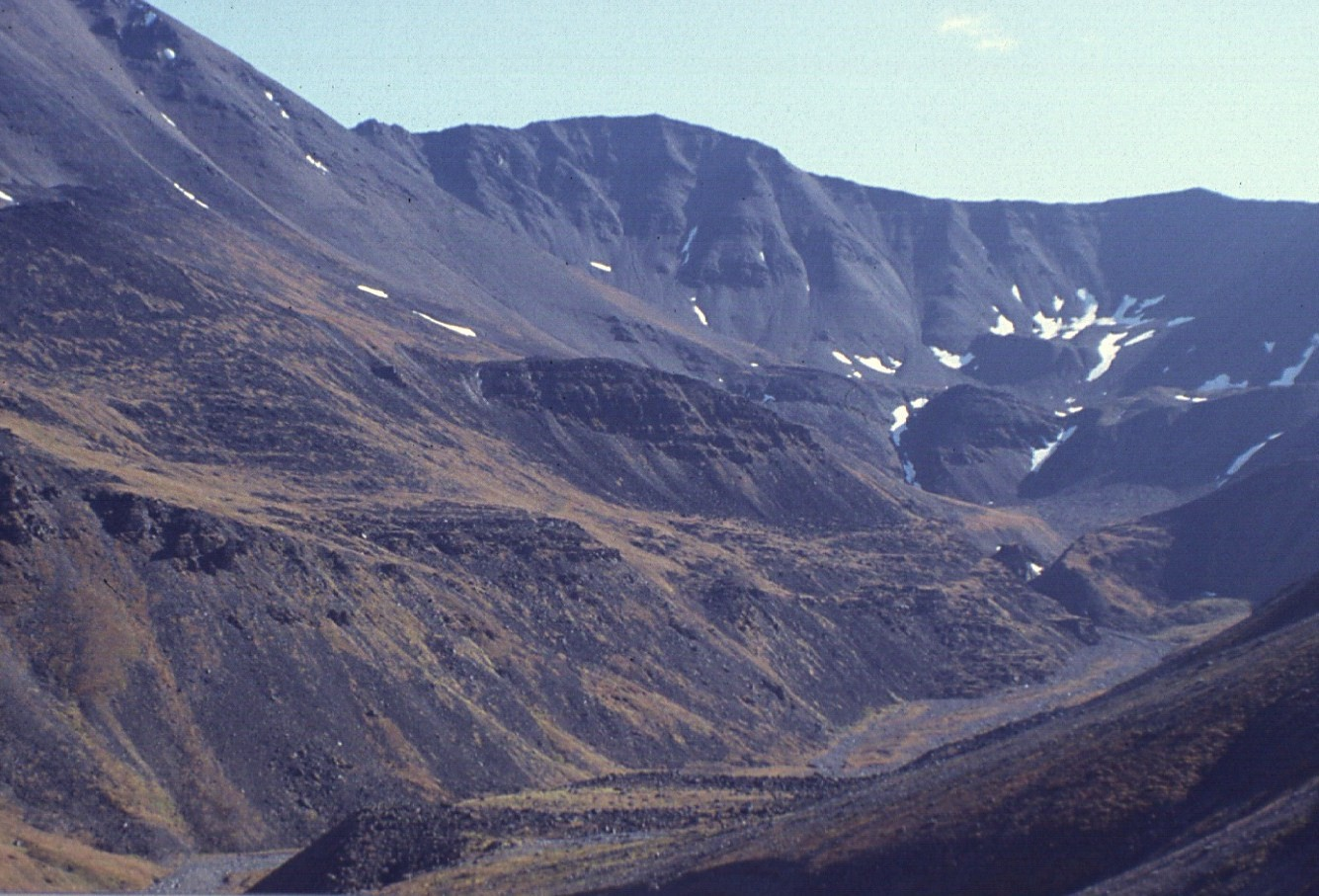
Atigun Pass, Dalton Highway

Atigun Pass (/ˈætɪɡən/ AT-i-gən), elevation 4,739 feet (1,444 m), is a high mountain pass across the Brooks Range in Alaska, located at the head of the Dietrich River. It is where the Dalton Highway crosses the Continental Divide (at mile marker 244), and is the highest pass in Alaska that is maintained throughout the year. Atigun is the only pass in the Brooks Range that is crossed by a road. The pass has been responsible for taking many drivers off the road and is also home to avalanches during the winter.

Atigun is known among bush pilots for the difficulty of crossing the pass with small planes; Anaktuvuk Pass is favored as the safer flying route.

The pass is often shown on the third and fourth seasons of the History Channel reality series Ice Road Truckers, which focuses on the challenges of driving on the Dalton Highway.

== Climate ==
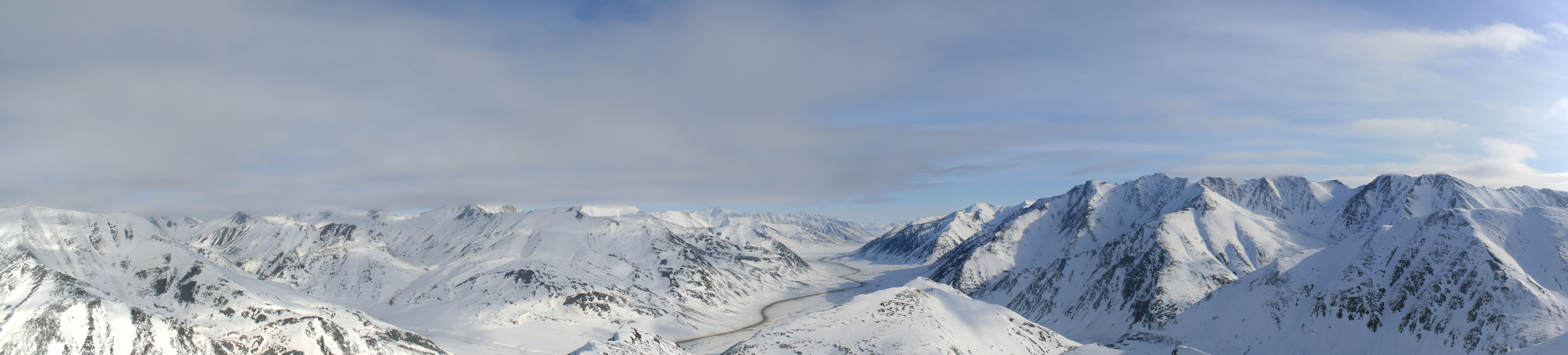
Atigun Pass, facing north.

Although the latitude of Atigun Pass is high, the location still has an alpine climate (Köppen: ETH). In addition, the precipitation is about five times that of places such as Utqiagvik or Umiat.

Climate data for Atigun Pass (2006–2020 normals, extremes 2006–present)
Month	Jan	Feb	Mar	Apr	May	Jun	Jul	Aug	Sep	Oct	Nov	Dec	Year
Record high °F (°C)	42 (6)	35 (2)	35 (2)	47 (8)	62 (17)	67 (19)	69 (21)	64 (18)	52 (11)	44 (7)	42 (6)	42 (6)	69 (21)
Mean maximum °F (°C)	25.6 (−3.6)	27.3 (−2.6)	24.5 (−4.2)	36.1 (2.3)	54.6 (12.6)	60.9 (16.1)	63.3 (17.4)	55.5 (13.1)	44.9 (7.2)	32.1 (0.1)	24.4 (−4.2)	25.0 (−3.9)	64.4 (18.0)
Mean daily maximum °F (°C)	2.1 (−16.6)	5.7 (−14.6)	7.5 (−13.6)	20.4 (−6.4)	37.5 (3.1)	49.2 (9.6)	51.4 (10.8)	44.2 (6.8)	33.6 (0.9)	18.9 (−7.3)	7.7 (−13.5)	5.6 (−14.7)	23.7 (−4.6)
Daily mean °F (°C)	−4.3 (−20.2)	−0.9 (−18.3)	0.6 (−17.4)	13.8 (−10.1)	31.0 (−0.6)	43.3 (6.3)	46.4 (8.0)	39.8 (4.3)	28.5 (−1.9)	14.8 (−9.6)	2.2 (−16.6)	−0.8 (−18.2)	17.9 (−7.9)
Mean daily minimum °F (°C)	−10.6 (−23.7)	−7.5 (−21.9)	−6.3 (−21.3)	7.3 (−13.7)	24.6 (−4.1)	37.3 (2.9)	41.5 (5.3)	35.3 (1.8)	24.4 (−4.2)	10.7 (−11.8)	−3.3 (−19.6)	−7.1 (−21.7)	12.2 (−11.0)
Mean minimum °F (°C)	−36.7 (−38.2)	−33.4 (−36.3)	−27.9 (−33.3)	−13.7 (−25.4)	3.1 (−16.1)	25.0 (−3.9)	31.6 (−0.2)	23.4 (−4.8)	11.4 (−11.4)	−6.1 (−21.2)	−22.2 (−30.1)	−28.7 (−33.7)	−40.4 (−40.2)
Record low °F (°C)	−46 (−43)	−44 (−42)	−47 (−44)	−44 (−42)	−16 (−27)	16 (−9)	23 (−5)	14 (−10)	0 (−18)	−14 (−26)	−40 (−40)	−42 (−41)	−47 (−44)
Average precipitation inches (mm)	0.79 (20)	0.94 (24)	0.70 (18)	0.98 (25)	1.55 (39)	2.95 (75)	4.20 (107)	4.35 (110)	2.69 (68)	1.30 (33)	0.82 (21)	0.82 (21)	22.09 (561)
Average extreme snow depth inches (cm)	36 (91)	39 (99)	41 (100)	45 (110)	47 (120)	25 (64)	0 (0)	2 (5.1)	14 (36)	24 (61)	29 (74)	34 (86)	48 (120)
Average precipitation days (≥ 0.01 inch)	4.7	6.0	5.6	7.1	8.5	12.6	15.0	15.5	13.4	9.6	6.2	5.2	109.4
Source 1: NOAA
Source 2: XMACIS2 (mean maxima/minima 2006–2020)
