= Robert Sterling Yard =

American wilderness activist and writer

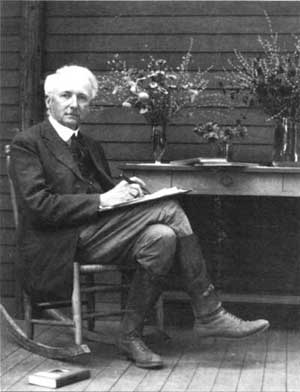
Robert Sterling Yard in Yosemite National Park, 1920

Robert Sterling Yard (February 1, 1861 – May 17, 1945) was an American writer, journalist, and wilderness activist. Born in Haverstraw, New York, Yard graduated from Princeton University and spent the first twenty years of his career in the editing and publishing business. In 1915, he was recruited by his friend Stephen Mather to help publicize the need for an independent national park agency. Their numerous publications were part of a movement that resulted in legislative support for a National Park Service (NPS) in 1916. Yard served as head of the National Parks Educational Committee for several years after its conception, but tension within the NPS led him to concentrate on non-government initiatives. He became executive secretary of the National Parks Association in 1919.

Yard worked to promote the national parks as well as educate Americans about their use. Creating high standards based on aesthetic ideals for park selection, he also opposed commercialism and industrialization of what he called "America's masterpieces". These standards subsequently caused discord with his peers. After helping to establish a relationship between the NPA and the United States Forest Service, Yard later became involved in the protection of wilderness areas. In 1935, he became one of the eight founding members of The Wilderness Society and acted as its first president from 1937 until his death eight years later. Yard is now considered an important figure in the modern wilderness movement.

== Early life and career ==
Robert Sterling Yard was born in 1861 in Haverstraw, New York, to Robert Boyd and Sarah (Purdue) Yard. After attending the Freehold Institute in New Jersey, he graduated from Princeton University in 1883. Known throughout his life as "Bob", he became a prominent member of Princeton's Alumni Association, and founded the Montclair Princeton Alumni Association. In 1895, he married Mary Belle Moffat; they had one daughter, Margaret.

During the 1880s and 1890s, Yard worked as a journalist for the New York Sun and the New York Herald. He served in the publishing business from 1900 to 1915, variously as editor-in-chief of The Century Magazine and Sunday editor of the New York Herald. After serving as editor of Charles Scribner's Sons' the Book Buyer, Yard helped launch the publishing firm of Moffat, Yard and Company. He served as vice president and editor-in-chief of the firm.

=== National Park Service ===
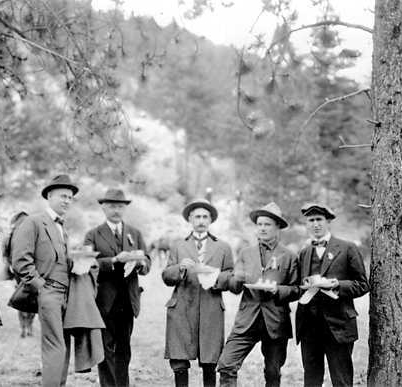
The 1915 dedication of Rocky Mountain National Park; (l to r): Stephen Mather, Yard, acting superintendent Trowbridge, NPS photographer Herford T. Cowling, and Horace M. Albright

In 1915, Yard was invited to Washington, D.C., by his friend Stephen Mather, who had started working on national parks as assistant to the Secretary of Interior. Yard and Mather had met while working for the New York Sun and became friends; Yard was the best man at Mather's wedding in 1893.

Mather, who wanted someone to help publicize the need for an independent agency to oversee the national parks movement, personally paid Yard's salary from his independent income. The United States had authorized 14 parks and 22 monuments over the previous forty years (1872–1915), but there was no single agency to provide unified management of the resources. In addition, some resources were managed by political appointees without professional qualifications. Together Mather and Yard ran a national parks publicity campaign for the Department of the Interior.

Although Yard was not an outdoorsman like most advocates of a national park service, he felt a connection to the cause, and eventually became personally invested in its success. At the National Park Conference in March 1915, he stated, "I, the treader of dusty city streets, boldly claim common kinship with you of the plains, the mountains, and the glaciers." He gathered data regarding popular American tourist destinations, such as Switzerland, France, Germany, Italy, and Canada, together with reasons why people visited certain areas; he also collected photographs and compiled lists of those who might enlist in the conservation cause. One of his most recognized and passionate articles of the time, entitled "Making a Business of Scenery", appeared in The Nation's Business in June 1916:

We want our national parks developed. We want roads and trails like Switzerland's. We want hotels of all prices from lowest to highest. We want comfortable public camps in sufficient abundance to meet all demands. We want lodges and chalets at convenient intervals commanding the scenic possibilities of all our parks. We want the best and cheapest accommodations for pedestrians and motorists. We want sufficient and convenient transportation at reasonable rates. We want adequate facilities and supplies for camping out at lowest prices. We want good fishing. We want our wild animal life conserved and developed. We want special facilities for nature study.

In 1916, Yard published the National Parks Portfolio (1916), a collection of nine pamphlets. That same year, Yard wrote and published Glimpses of Our National Parks, which was followed in 1917 by a similar volume titled The Top of the Continent. The latter volume, which was subtitled A Cheerful Journey through Our National Parks and geared toward a younger audience, became a bestseller.

Yard and Mather's publicity and lobbying resulted in the creation of the National Park Service; on August 25, 1916, President Woodrow Wilson signed a bill establishing the agency "to conserve the scenery and the natural and historic objects and wild life therein, and to provide for the enjoyment of the same in such manner and by such means as will leave them unimpaired for the enjoyment of future generations." Mather served as its first director beginning in 1917, and while he appointed Horace Albright as assistant director, he put Yard in charge of the National Parks Educational Committee. It consisted of only of Yard and a secretary.

In January 1917, Mather suffered a mental breakdown and had to take an extended leave. Yard believed he would be appointed interim director at the NPS. Disagreements within the organization, however, kept him from the position. Yard, who has been described as "intense, urbane and opinionated", was disappointed when the position was given to Albright, who was then only 27 years old. After more than a year of working in the Educational Division, Yard began to look outside the NPS for support.

== National Parks Association ==
Yard believed that while the National Park Service was effective as a government agency, it was not capable of promoting the wishes of the common American. He wrote in June 1918 that the national park movement must "be cultivated only by an organization of the people outside the government, and unhampered by politics and routine". On May 29, 1919, the National Parks Association (NPA) was officially created to fill this role. Yard, who became a pivotal figure in the new society, was elected its executive secretary.

In its early years, the NPA was Yard's livelihood and passion: he recruited the key founding members, raised money and wrote various press releases. Yard also served as editor of the NPA's National Parks Bulletin from 1919 to 1936. In the first issue, Yard outlined the organization's objectives in order to craft a broad educational program: not only would they attract students, artists and writers to the parks, but a "complete and rational system" would be created and adhered to by Congress and the Park Service.

Yard believed that eligible national parks had to be scenically stunning. He noted in his 1919 volume The Book of the National Parks that the major characteristic of almost all national parks was that their scenery had been forged by geological or biological processes. He wrote, "[W]e shall not really enjoy our possession of the grandest scenery in the world until we realize that scenery is the written page of the History of Creation, and until we learn to read that page." Yard's standards also insisted upon "complete conservation", meaning avoidance of commercialism and industrialization. Often referring to parks as "American masterpieces", he sought to protect them from economic activities such as timber cutting and mineral extracting. In such, Yard often advocated the preservation of "wilderness" conditions in America's national parks.

In 1920, Congress passed the Water Power Act, which granted licenses to develop hydroelectric projects on federal lands, including national parks. Yard and the NPA joined again with Mather and the National Park Service to oppose the intrusion on Park Service control. In 1921, Congress passed the Jones-Esch Bill, amending the Water Power Act to exclude existing national parks from hydroelectric development.

== Conflict and the Forest Service ==
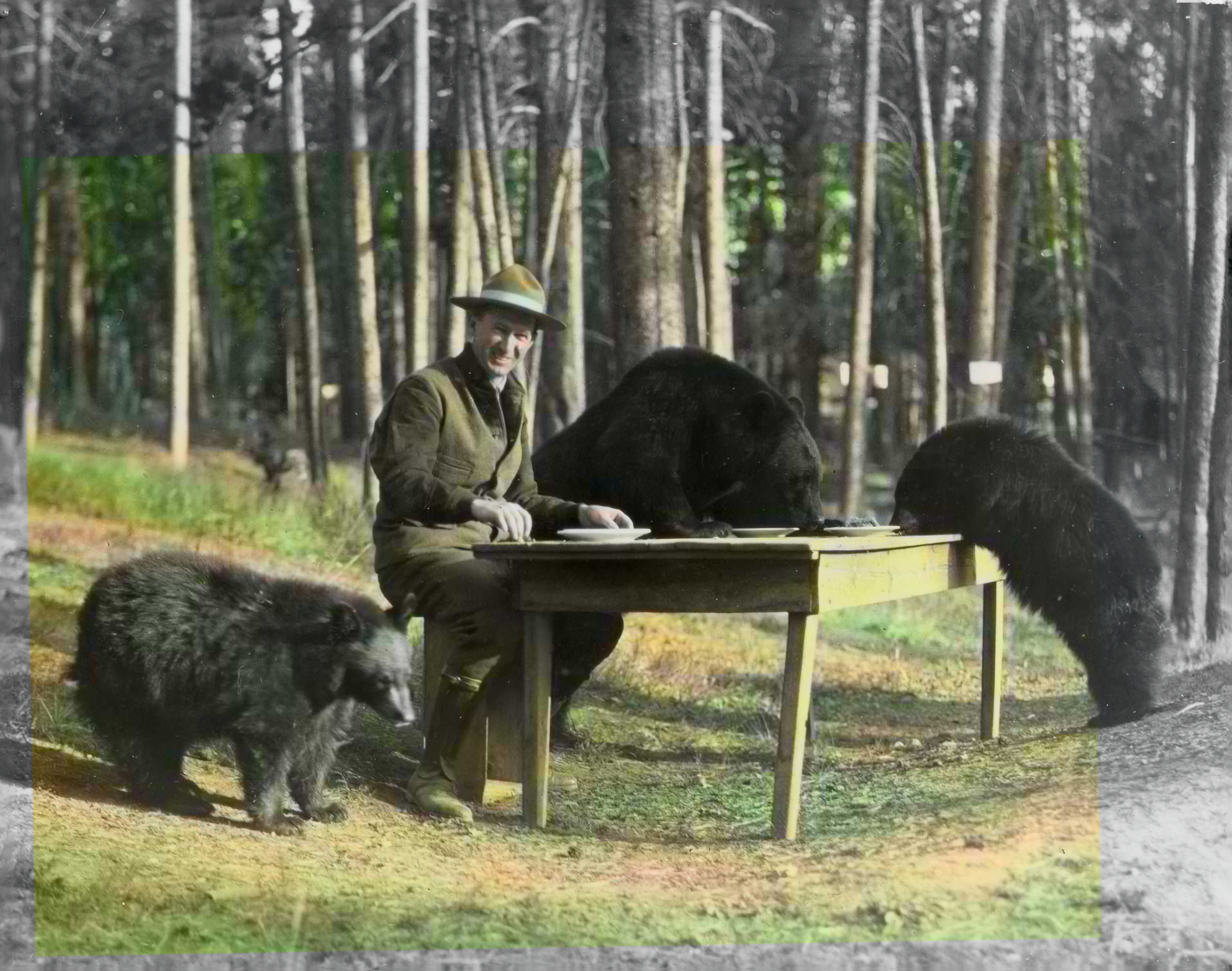
Horace Albright enjoying a "bear dinner"; Yard was opposed to such publicity stunts in national parks

Despite agreeing on most issues regarding the protection of national parks, friction between the NPA and NPS was seemingly unavoidable. Mather and Yard disagreed on many issues; whereas Mather was not interested in the protection of wildlife and accepted the Biological Survey's efforts to exterminate predators within parks, Yard criticized the program as early as 1924. Yard was also highly critical of Mather's administration of the parks. Mather advocated plush accommodations, city comforts and various entertainments to encourage park visitation. These plans clashed with Yard's ideals, and he considered such urbanization of the nation's parks misguided. While visiting Yosemite National Park in 1926, he stated that the valley was "lost" after he found crowds, automobiles, jazz music and a bear show.

In 1924, the United States Forest Service started a program to set aside "primitive areas" in the national forests to protect wilderness while opening it to use. Yard, who preferred to give the land that did not meet his standards to the Forest Service rather than the NPS, began to work closely with the USFS. Beginning in 1925, he served as secretary of the Joint Committee on the Recreational Survey of Federal Lands, a position he held until 1930. Composed of members of both the NPA and the USFS, the committee sought a separate national recreation policy that would distinguish between recreational and preservation areas. The NPA and Yard were both criticized by activists who feared that the association would be eclipsed by the Forest Service's own program goals. Yard at times felt isolated and under-appreciated by his peers. He wrote in 1926, "I wonder whether I'm justified in forcing this work upon people who seem to care so little about it."

He continued to clash with others regarding legislation on park proposals. These included the Shenandoah National Park in Virginia, which Yard thought was too recreational and not of the caliber of a national park. He hesitated at the nomination of the Everglades National Park in Florida. When the Tropic Everglades National Park Association was founded in 1928 to promote the idea of a national park in south Florida, Yard was initially skeptical that it was necessary. Although he recognized the need for preservation, he did not accept proposals for a national park unless the area met his high scenic standards. He slowly warmed to the Everglades idea, and in 1931 supported the proposal under conditions that the area remain pristine, with limited tourist development. The Everglades National Park was authorized by Congress in 1934.

== The Wilderness Society ==
Yard's preservationist goals exceeded those of the Park Service in the 1930s. Drifting away from the national parks lobby, he pushed to preserve what he called "primitive" land; he and John C. Merriam had discussed forming a group called "Save the Primitive League". Although that group was not formed, Yard was soon invited to become a founding member of The Wilderness Society. Seventy-four-years old at the time, he was known for his tireless work ethic and youthfulness; for decades he had jokingly insisted to colleagues that he was a mere 47.

The society was officially formed in January 1935 to lead wilderness preservation in the United States. Additional founding members included notable conservationists Bob Marshall, Benton MacKaye, Bernard Frank, Aldo Leopold, and Harvey Broome. In September, Yard published the first issue of the society's magazine, The Living Wilderness. He wrote of the society's genesis, "The Wilderness Society is born of an emergency in conservation which admits of no delay. The craze is to build all the highways possible everywhere while billions may yet be borrowed from the unlucky future. The fashion is to barber and manicure wild America as smartly as the modern girl. Our mission is clear."

Although Marshall proposed that Leopold act as the society's first president, in 1937 Yard accepted the role, as well as that of permanent secretary. He ran the society from his home in Washington, D.C., and single-handedly produced The Living Wilderness during its early years, with one issue annually until 1945. Yard did the greater share of work during the Society's early years; he solicited membership, corresponded with other conservation groups, and kept track of congressional activities related to wilderness areas. Although much older than some of his colleagues, Yard was described as a cautious and non-confrontational leader.

== Death and legacy ==
While ill from pneumonia at the end of his life, he ran the society's affairs from his bed. He died on May 17, 1945, at the age of 84.

The National Park Service and what is now called the National Parks Conservation Association remain successful organizations. The National Park System of the United States protects more than 400 sites covering an area exceeding 84 million acres (340,000 km^{2}) in all 50 states, Washington, D.C., American Samoa, Guam, Puerto Rico, Saipan, and the Virgin Islands. His work to preserve wilderness in the United States has also endured. After his death, three members of The Wilderness Society took on his various duties; Benton MacKaye officially replaced him as president, but executive secretary Howard Zahniser and director Olaus Murie ran the society for the next two decades. Zahniser also took over the society's magazine, making The Living Wilderness into a successful quarterly publication.

The December 1945 issue of The Living Wilderness was dedicated to Yard's life and work; in one article, fellow co-founder Ernest Oberholtzer wrote that "the form he [Yard] gave The Wilderness Society was the crowning of a lifelong vision. He undertook it with a freshness that belied his years and revealed, as nothing else could, the vitality of his inspiration. Few men in America have ever had such understanding of the spiritual quality of the American scene, and fewer still the voice to go with it."

Yard's effect on the Wilderness Society proved long-lasting; he was responsible for initiating cooperation with other major preservationist groups, including the National Park Association. He also established a durable alliance with the Sierra Club, founded in 1892 by noted preservationist John Muir. This alliance proved crucial during the proposal and eventual passage of the Wilderness Act. The act, which was signed into law by President Lyndon B. Johnson on September 3, 1964, was the first major victory for The Wilderness Society. Written by Zahniser, it enabled Congress to set aside selected areas in the national forests, national parks, national wildlife refuges and other federal lands, as units to be kept permanently unchanged by humans. Since its conception, 111 million acres (452,000 km^{2}) have been added to the National Wilderness Preservation System.

== Selected list of works ==
- The Publisher (1913)
- Glimpses of Our National Parks (1916)
- The National Parks Portfolio (1916 and five subsequent editions)
- The Top of the Continent (1917)
- The Book of the National Parks (1919)
- Our Federal Lands: A Romance of American Development (1928)
