= Ernie Dickerman =

American conservationist (1910–1998)

Ernest Miller Dickerman (December 22, 1910 – July 31, 1998) was an American wilderness advocate and conservationist. Known as the "Grandfather of Eastern Wilderness", he was particularly instrumental in securing legal protection for wild land in Virginia and eastern United States.

== Early life and career ==
Born in Austin, Illinois, Dickerman moved at the age of three to the Adirondacks. When he was six, his family relocated to Richmond, Virginia, where his mother later died from tuberculosis. Dickerman and his two siblings went to boarding schools. He attended Gettysburg Academy in Pennsylvania, and then Oberlin College, graduating in 1931 with a degree in economics.

In 1934 he moved to Knoxville to work for the newly established Tennessee Valley Authority (TVA). After three and a half years he left TVA to work as a production manager with the Patent Button Company of Tennessee, and stayed for nearly twenty years. While in Knoxville, Dickerman became enamored of the Smoky Mountains. He spent much of his free time hiking and camping in the mountains, later stating "When I found the Smoky Mountains... I knew I had found what I was looking for on this planet."

== The Wilderness Society ==
He became a member of the Conservation Committee of the Smoky Mountains Hiking Club, where he became close friends with attorney and Knoxville-native Harvey Broome, one of the eight founders of The Wilderness Society. Dickerman signed on as one of The Society's charter members shortly after its inception in 1935, eventually joining the staff in 1966.

Dickerman was recruited by The Wilderness Society to organize public opposition to a proposal to build a second trans-mountain highway through 22 miles (35 km) of remote ridges and forests of the Great Smoky Mountains National Park from Bryson City, North Carolina, to Townsend, Tennessee. Since this project was a favorite of National Park Service's Director George B. Hartzog Jr., the fight was long and hard. Dickerman traveled the country, giving speeches and organizing hikes in order to raise public awareness of the damage such a project would inflict on the park. After seven years of controversy, Hartzog was forced to abandon the proposal.

After that victory, Dickerman's main goal was to apply the newly passed Wilderness Act of 1964 to the eastern United States. He traveled widely, giving lectures on the importance of wilderness and the benefits the Act offered. Known for his quiet passion and amiable nature, he gained a reputation as a formidable speaker. Dickerman moved to Washington, D.C., headquarters of The Society, in 1969. His intense lobbying paid off when, in 1975, President Gerald Ford signed the Eastern Wilderness Areas Act. Acknowledging that eastern forests could one day recover their natural appearance, the act recognized sixteen new wildernesses in the Eastern United States, totaling nearly 207,000 acres

While working for The Wilderness Society, Dickerman also acted as manager for the Robert Marshall Wilderness Fund.

== Retirement and later life ==
After retiring from The Society in 1976, at the age of 65, Dickerman moved to his nephew's farm in Buffalo Gap, Virginia. However, he continued to work as an advocate for wilderness preservation. Soon after his retirement, he was elected president of the Virginia Wilderness Committee, and he served as mentor to a new generation of conservationists and lobbyists for wild land protection. He presided over the passage of two major wilderness bills for Virginia, in 1984 and 1988. Shortly before his death at the age of 87, he composed the following announcement:

On (date) Ernest M. "Ernie" Dickerman, a lifelong bachelor, died at the age of 87 by his own hand as he had long planned, on the little old farm in the Allegheny Mountains where he had lived since retiring in 1976. "Quit while you are ahead" is sound philosophy, both in poker and in life. For over sixty years, as an amateur or as a professional, he was an active conservationist, especially in wilderness preservation.
