= Frances Andrews (conservationist) =

Frances Elizabeth Andrews
- Born: October 9, 1884; Fargo, North Dakota
- Died: 1961

Frances Elizabeth Andrews (1884-1961) was a conservationist who created Hunt Hill Nature Center in Wisconsin. She was also involved in the creation of the Boundary Waters Canoe Area, as well as other conservation efforts in Minnesota, Wisconsin, and Michigan.

== Biography ==
Frances Elizabeth Andrews was the daughter of wealthy Minneapolis grain merchant Arthur Andrews and Mary Hunt Andrews, whose father was a New York legislator and businessman. Frances's parents were both Oberlin College grads, and were married in 1880. They moved several times, including to Fargo, North Dakota, which was where Frances was born. Arthur established a lumber and hardware business in Fargo and soon began to build grain mills. When Frances was nine, the family moved to Minneapolis where Arthur established a partnership with James Gage. At first, the family lived in an apartment on the elite Park Avenue, and Arthur soon built a large home in the Loring Park area of Minneapolis with hired staff who cleaned, cooked, gardened, and chauffeured the household. Her parents were both active in philanthropy.

During the summers, her family traveled to a rustic cottage on Barnum's Island near Isle Royale where Frances and her brother, William Hunt Andrews, hiked, fished, and gathered wild foods. When Frances was seventeen and William was fourteen, they spent time alone on the island, and William worked as a hunting guide. The family also owned land on Rainy Lake.

Frances attended Oberlin College in 1904, graduating in 1906.

In 1912, Mary Hunt Andrews died. Frances was 27, and received responsibility for the Andrews' household and social obligations. She developed her own interests to which she would give money to, largely in the arts, and for social issues and conservation. William died several years after Mary, following a long illness. To honor Mary and William's love of the outdoors, Arthur Hunt purchased a large trace to land near Sarona, Wisconsin and named it Hunt Hill in their memory, as Hunt was Mary's family name.

After her father died in 1951, she inherited the Andrews wealth, which she put towards conservation efforts.

Frances Andrews died in 1961. She donated a large sum to the Minneapolis Institute of Arts. Her will also provided funding for the Minnesota Orchestral Association, Planned Parenthood of Minnesota, Quetico Superior Foundation, and international exchange programs at Oberlin College and the University of Minnesota. She donated her families papers to her friend Ernest Oberholtzer, who in turn donated them to the Minnesota Historical Society along with his own works.

== Conservation efforts ==
After her father purchased Hunt Hill, Andrews assumed oversight of the property, with the goal of restoring the farmland and returning the site to a natural state. For thirty-five years, she established wildlife habitat and managed the farm sustainably.

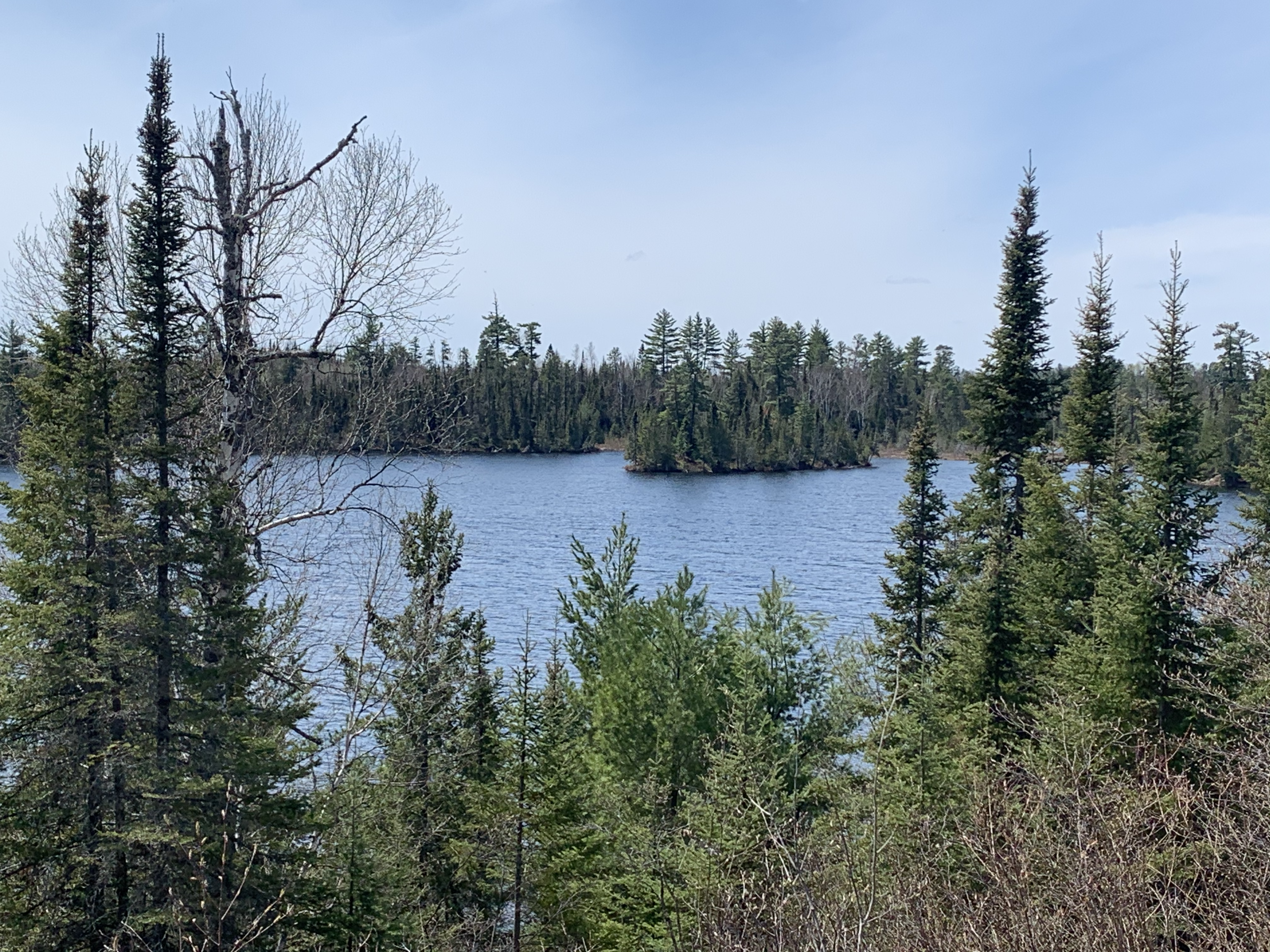
The BWCA was one of many conservation projects that Andrews worked on.

In the 1920s, Andrews began working with other conservationists who sought to set aside wilderness areas for the common good. She was a contemporary and friend of the major players who were involved in the preservation project resulting in the Boundary Waters Canoe Area Wilderness, including Ernest Oberholtzer, Sewell Tyng, Aldo Leopold, and Sigurd Olson. Although men made up the public face of the BWCA project, Andrews and other women such as Frances Densmore and Gratia Countryman were active in strategic planning, writing letters, and connecting wealthy donors to the cause. Andrews also advocated for conservation in Wisconsin and on Michigan's Isle Royale, as well as of Mallard Island, where Oberholtzer lived and Frances rented.

Andrews had a particularly strong relationship with Oberholtzer, whom she met through mutual friends who were working on the passage of the Shipstead-Newton Act, which radically protected the land that would become the BWCA, defeating Edward Wellington Backus's plan to build a series of dam in the Rainy Lake watershed. The bill passed on July 3, 1930. Andrews wished to support Oberholzer's conservation effort, and began funding the Quetico-Superior Council and the Izaak Walton League to supplement his salary.

Along with Oberholtzer, who had personal relationships with many Ojibwe, Frances worked to find economic opportunities for Ojibwe families in Grand Portage to keep them on their land and preserve their way of life. Frances also worked with Oberholtzer on various land conservation projects, including land on Bancroft Bay and Deer Island, which was later donated to Camp Koochiching. They were also interested in Isle Royale National Park, the establishment of the Grand Portage Historic Monument, the relocation of Highway 61 to run through the Grand Portage Indian Reservation, and the Quetico-Superior program.

In 1951, Arthur Andrews died, leaving Frances as the last surviving member of the family. She deeded the Hunt Hill property to the National Audubon Society, stipulating that it should be run as a nature camp for Minnesota and Wisconsin residents, to allow flora and fauna to live out their natural lives, and that year-round conservation research should be done in partnership with local organizations. The "Audubon Camp of Wisconsin" opened at Hunt Hill in 1955.

The preservation of wilderness areas is of great importance to me and I, therefore, trust that the Society will maintain the Hunt Hill property in its natural condition.

— Frances Andrews, Letter to the National Audubon Society

In Andrews' will after she died in 1961, she gave money to the Nature Conservancy in the name of her brother, and established the Minneapolis Foundation's Andrews-Hunt Fund to support the Hunt Hill nature center. The fund also provides assistance to other philanthropic programs. The National Audubon Society received a $125,000 endowment to be used for Hunt Hill which still supports the nature center, while the board of directors continues to guide its work by Andrews’ stipulations. Money Andrews gifted to Obeholtzer in her will later made up the Ernest C. Oberholtzer Foundation, which worked to support Ojibwe culture and preserving wilderness areas.

== See also ==
- Ernest Oberholtzer
- Boundary Waters Canoe Area
