= Eastern Wilderness Areas Act =

1975 US federal law

- Other short titles: Eastern Wilderness Act
- Long title: An Act to further the purposes of the Wilderness Act by designating certain acquired lands for inclusion in the National Wilderness Preservation System, to provide for study of certain additional lands for such inclusion, and for other purposes.
- Enacted by: the 93rd United States Congress
- Effective: January 3, 1975

Citations
- Public law: 93-622
- Statutes at Large: 88 Stat. 3433

Legislative history
- Introduced in the Senate by George Aiken (R–VT) on May 2, 1974; Passed the Senate on May 31, 1974 (passed); Passed the House on December 18, 1974 (passed) with amendment; Senate agreed to House amendment on December 19, 1974 (agreed); Signed into law by President Gerald Ford on January 3, 1975

The Eastern Wilderness Areas Act (Pub. L. 93–622, 88 Stat. 2096) was signed into law by President Gerald Ford on January 3, 1975. The Act designated 16 new wilderness areas in the Eastern United States, including 207,000 acres (84,000 ha) of wilderness on national lands in 13 states. Although it was originally untitled, the bill signed by Ford has come to be known as the Eastern Wilderness Areas Act.

The Act built upon the Wilderness Act, which was written by Howard Zahniser of The Wilderness Society and signed into law by President Lyndon B. Johnson in 1964. While the Wilderness Act created the legal definition of wilderness in the United States, the Eastern Wilderness Areas Act applied only to land east of the 100th meridian west.

== Background ==
In 1964, both the Forest Service and Congress agreed that eastern areas would have qualified as wilderness. However, six years later, the Forest Service opposed congressional designation of new wilderness areas in West Virginia with land use histories of logging. In 1971, it adopted a "purity" interpretation for wilderness designation so that no eastern or western lands with a history of human disturbance could qualify as wilderness.

The Forest Service drafted its own bill as an alternative "to establish a system of wild areas within the land of the national forest system" that would have allowed cutting trees to "improve" wildlife habitat and recreation. The organization described the bill as necessary because eastern areas "do not meet the strict criteria of the Wilderness Act." Members of Congress who championed the Wilderness Act resolved to overturn the misconception that wilderness areas included only those "pristine" in nature. Senator Henry Jackson warned of this "serious and fundamental misinterpretation of the Wilderness Act" and pledged himself to correct the falsity of the so-called purity theory. Senator Frank Church, who had been leader of the Senate debate on the Wilderness Act, observed that "the effect of such an interpretation would be to automatically disqualify almost everything, for few if any lands on this continent—or any other—have escaped man’s imprint to some degree."

To counteract the Forest Service bill, advocates for wilderness, including The Wilderness Society, the Sierra Club, and Friends of the Earth, and their congressional allies, responded with the proposed Eastern Wilderness Areas Act. Promoted largely by Ernie Dickerman, a Wilderness Society staff member, and George Aiken, a senator from Vermont, the Senate endorsed the bill in May 1974.

The final legislation adopted some elements of the Forest Service-inspired bill, but it did not alter the definition and intent of the Wilderness Act of 1964. The previous debate regarding the meaning of "wilderness" versus "pristine" land led to the understanding that cultural use of lands should not keep the area from being restored to a "secondary wilderness," with functioning natural processes similar to when the land was in a primary state. Therefore, the Eastern Wilderness Areas Act explicitly protects lands that both suffered previous abuse and have the ability to recover and therefore be designated for wilderness protection.

== Wilderness areas created ==
Designated Wilderness Areas
Num.	Wilderness	from National Forest	Approximate Area		State(s)
Num.	Wilderness	from National Forest	acres	ha	State(s)
1	Sipsey Wilderness	Bankhead National Forest	12,000	4,900	Alabama
2	Caney Creek Wilderness	Ouachita National Forest	14,433	5,841	Arkansas
3	Upper Buffalo Wilderness	Ozark National Forest	10,590	4,290	Arkansas
4	Bradwell Bay Wilderness	Apalachicola National Forest	22,000	8,900	Florida
5	Beaver Creek Wilderness	Daniel Boone National Forest	5,500	2,200	Kentucky
6	Presidential Range-Dry River Wilderness	White Mountain National Forest	20,380	8,250	New Hampshire
7	Joyce Kilmer-Slickrock Wilderness	Nantahala and Cherokee National Forests	15,000	6,100	North Carolina and Tennessee
8	Ellicott Rock Wilderness	Sumter, Nantahala, and Chattahoochee National Forests	3,600	1,500	South Carolina, North Carolina, and Georgia
9	Gee Creek Wilderness	Cherokee National Forest	2,570	1,040	Tennessee
10	Bristol Cliffs Wilderness	Green Mountain National Forest	6,500	2,600	Vermont
11	Lye Brook Wilderness	Green Mountain National Forest	14,300	5,800	Vermont
12	James River Face Wilderness	Jefferson National Forest	8,800	3,600	Virginia
13	Dolly Sods Wilderness	Monongahela National Forest	10,215	4,134	West Virginia
14	Otter Creek Wilderness	Monongahela National Forest	20,000	8,100	West Virginia
15	Rainbow Lake Wilderness	Chequamegon National Forest	6,600	2,700	Wisconsin

== See also ==
- List of U.S. Wilderness Areas

== Bibliography ==
- Johnson, Christopher (2006). This Grand & Magnificent Place: The Wilderness Heritage of the White Mountains. Durham, NH: University of New Hampshire Press.
- Rennicke, Jeff (February 1992). "Micro-Wild". Backpacker. 20 (112).
- Scott, Doug (2004). The Enduring Wilderness. Golden, CO: Fulcrum Publishing. ISBN 9781555915278.
