= Stewart M. Brandborg =

American conservation activist

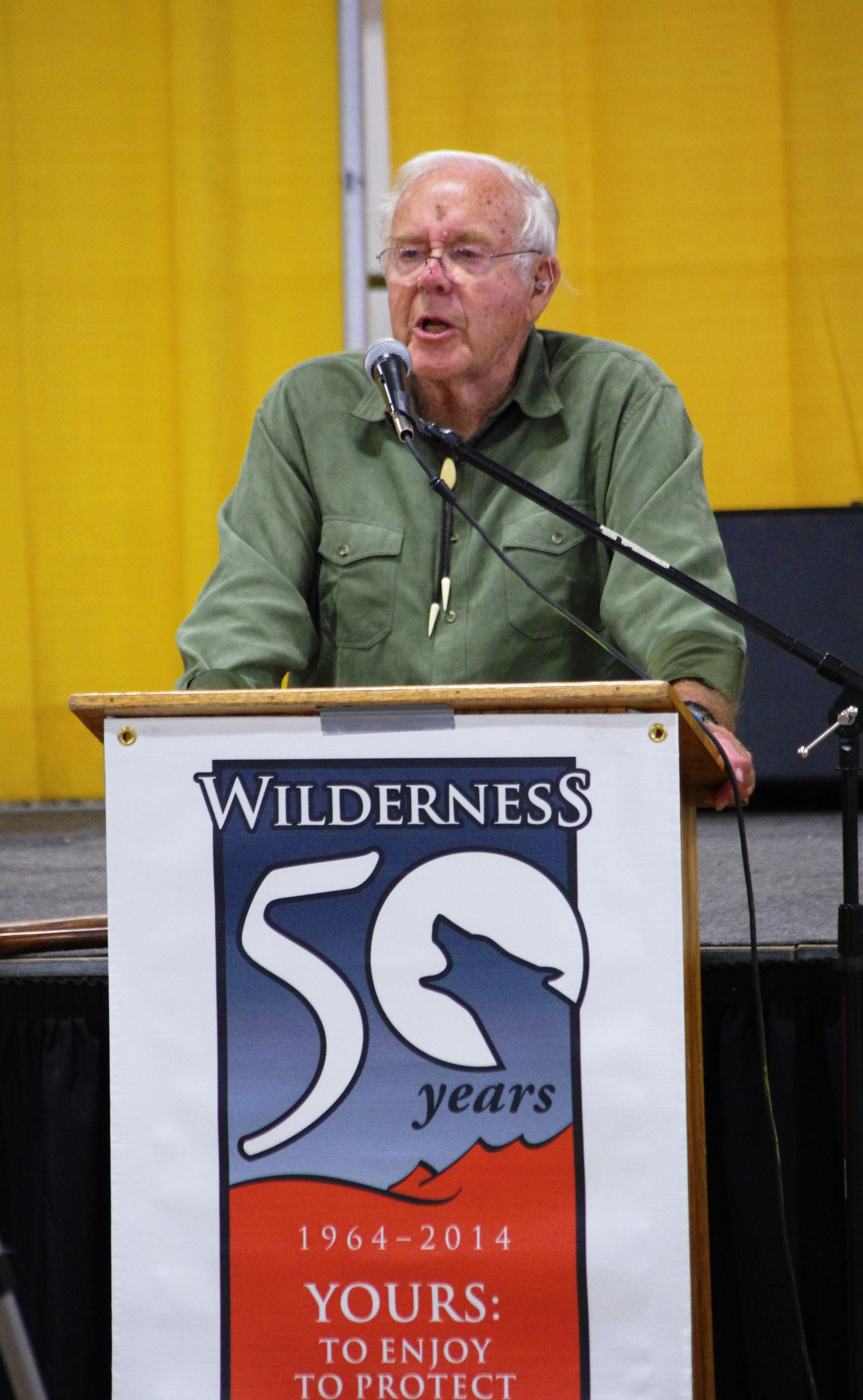
- Born: February 2, 1925; Lewiston, Idaho, US
- Died: April 14, 2018 (aged 93); Hamilton, Montana, US
- Education: University of Montana (B.S.); University of Idaho (M.S.)
- Organization(s): National Wildlife Federation; Wilderness Society; National Park Service

Stewart M. Brandborg (February 2, 1925 - April 14, 2018) was an American conservation activist. He studied wildlife technologies at the University of Montana (B.S., 1947) and the University of Idaho (M.S., 1951). Brandborg worked for various environmental organizations, most notably as the director of the Wilderness Society.

== Early life and education ==
Stewart Brandborg was born on February 2, 1925, in Lewiston, Idaho. His father, Guy Brandborg, was the assistant to the forest supervisor of the Nez Perce National Forest. The Brandborg family moved to Montana in 1935, where Brandborg would serve as the forest supervisor for the Bitterroot National Forest for twenty years. In 1943, Stewart Brandborg began university studies at Montana State University in Missoula (now called the University of Montana). It was here that Stewart met his future wife, Anna Vee Mather. Brandborg graduated in 1947 with a bachelor's degree in science specializing in wildlife technologies. He and Anna Vee became married in 1949 and would later have five children.

Brandborg conducted pioneering mountain goat research while working for the Montana Department of Fish and Game in the late 1940s. He was a research fellow at the Idaho Cooperative Wildlife Research Unit while studying for his master's degree in Forestry at the University of Idaho in 1949. Upon graduating in 1951, Brandborg conducted research and management investigations on the mountain goat, elk, and other big game species with the Idaho Department of Fish and Game, where he worked through 1953.

== Career ==
In 1954, Brandborg and his family moved to Washington, D.C., where he had taken a position with the National Wildlife Federation as an assistant conservation director. While with the Federation, Brandborg worked with local conservation leaders on proposed dams on the Clearwater River in Idaho. He assisted in extending the Keep America Beautiful program to a state level and oversaw the publication and circulation of conservation literature to the public. In 1956, while still with the National Wildlife Federation, Brandborg was elected to the governing board of The Wilderness Society, and in 1960, he was hired by The Wilderness Society as associate executive director. Brandborg became the director of the Wilderness Society in 1964 following the death of then-director Howard Zahniser.

While at the Wilderness Society, Brandborg emphasized working with local groups on conservation issues and the importance of grassroots volunteers. He proposed and supported wilderness areas for designation under the newly minted National Wilderness Preservation Act, which passed in 1964. Brandborg advocated for the Wilderness Society to stop a proposal for a Trans-Alaskan pipeline that threatened wilderness and wildlife in Alaska beginning in the late 1960s and early 1970s. Although the pipeline was eventually built, the efforts of The Wilderness Society led to greater environmental regulations on the pipeline and the eventual declaration of over 100 million acres of parks, refuges, and wild rivers in Alaska. After departing from The Wilderness Society in 1976, Brandborg worked as a special assistant to the director of The National Park Service until 1981. In this position, Brandborg was responsible for the development of citizen participation programs to foster communication between the National Park Service and local citizens. In 1982, Brandborg became the national coordinator for The Regional Environmental Leadership Conference Series. Brandborg developed training materials and organized regional conferences to train new leaders in the environmental movement. He worked with The Leadership Series until he left Washington to return to Montana in 1986.

== Later years ==
Brandborg returned to Montana's Bitterroot Valley and served as president of the Friends of the Bitterroot from 1988 to 1990 and with Bitterrooters for Planning. In 1998, he served on the board of directors of Wilderness Watch. Brandborg was the recipient of the Robert Marshall Award in 2000, which is "The Wilderness Society's highest award presented to a private citizen who has never held federal office but has devoted long-term service to and has had a notable influence upon conservation and the fostering of an American land ethic." He continued to work on environmental issues at a more local level from his home in Hamilton, Montana, until his death on April 14, 2018.
