= Harold C. Anderson =

American accountant and wilderness activist

Harold C. Anderson was an American accountant and wilderness activist. A prominent member of the Potomac Appalachian Trail Club (PATC) in the Washington D.C. area from its inception, he was also a co-founder of The Wilderness Society.

Because of his ties to the PATC, Anderson was well acquainted with Benton MacKaye, a forester who was the first to propose the Appalachian Trail. Anderson was especially concerned with the proposed building of skylines along the Appalachian crest, something that he shared with MacKaye, who was at the time butting heads with PATC president Myron Avery on the subject. In August 1934, Anderson wrote to MacKaye of his desire to originate the country's first society dedicated to the protection of wilderness: "You and Bob Marshall have been preaching that those who love the primitive should get together and give a united expression of their views. That is what I would like to get started."
