= Bob Marshall (wilderness activist) =

American wilderness activist (1901–1939)

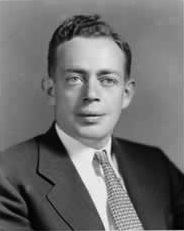
- Born: January 2, 1901; New York City, US
- Died: November 11, 1939 (aged 38); New York City, US
- Burial place: Salem Fields Cemetery
- Occupation: Forester
- Employer(s): Bureau of Indian Affairs; United States Forest Service
- Known for: Founder, The Wilderness Society
- Notable work: Arctic Village (1933)
- Parent(s): Louis Marshall; Florence Lowenstein Marshall
- Relatives: George Marshall

Robert Marshall (January 2, 1901 – November 11, 1939) was an American forester, writer and wilderness activist who is best remembered as the person who spearheaded the 1935 founding of the Wilderness Society in the United States. Marshall developed a love for the outdoors as a young child. He was an avid hiker and climber who visited the Adirondack Mountains frequently during his youth, ultimately becoming one of the first Adirondack Forty-Sixers. He also traveled to the Brooks Range of the far northern Alaskan wilderness. He wrote numerous articles and books about his travels, including the bestselling 1933 book Arctic Village.

A scientist with a PhD in plant physiology, Marshall became independently wealthy after the death of his father in 1929. He had started his outdoor career in 1925 as forester with the U.S. Forest Service. He used his financial independence for expeditions to Alaska and other wilderness areas. Later he held two significant public appointed posts: chief of forestry in the Bureau of Indian Affairs, from 1933 to 1937, and head of recreation management in the Forest Service, from 1937 to 1939, both during the administration of President Franklin D. Roosevelt. During this period, he directed the promulgation of regulations to preserve large areas of roadless land that were under federal management. Many years after his death, some of those areas were permanently protected from development, exploitation, and mechanization with the passage of the Wilderness Act of 1964.

Defining wilderness as a social as well as an environmental ideal, Marshall promoted organization of a national group dedicated to the preservation of primeval land. In 1935, he was one of the principal founders of The Wilderness Society and personally provided most of the Society's funding in its first years. He also supported socialism and civil liberties throughout his life.

Marshall died of heart failure at the age of 38 in 1939. Twenty-five years later, partly as a result of his efforts, The Wilderness Society helped gain passage of the Wilderness Act. The Act was passed by Congress in 1964 and legally defined wilderness areas of the United States and protected some nine million acres (36,000 km^{2}) of federal land from development, road building and motorized transportation. Today, Marshall is considered largely responsible for the wilderness preservation movement. Several areas and landmarks, including The Bob Marshall Wilderness in Montana and Mount Marshall in the Adirondacks, have been named in his honor.

== Early life and education ==
Born in New York City, Bob Marshall was the third of four children of Louis Marshall and Florence (née Lowenstein) Marshall.

His father, the son of Jewish immigrants from Bavaria, was a noted wealthy constitutional lawyer, conservationist, and a champion of minority rights. The family moved to Syracuse, New York, where Louis Marshall was active in the Jewish community and a co-founder of the American Jewish Committee. In 1891, he was part of a national delegation that sought federal intervention on behalf of persecuted Russian Jews. An amateur naturalist and active conservationist, Louis Marshall was instrumental in securing "forever wild" protection for the Adirondack and Catskill Forest Preserves in New York State. He helped found the New York State College of Forestry at Syracuse University, now State University of New York College of Environmental Science and Forestry (SUNY-ESF). Florence Marshall, meanwhile, devoted herself to her family, the education of young Jewish women, and the work of several Jewish welfare organizations.

Bob Marshall attended Felix Adler's private Ethical Culture School in New York City until 1919. The school nurtured independent thinking and commitment to social justice. Marshall became involved in nature from a young age; two of his childhood heroes were Meriwether Lewis and William Clark, who explored the Louisiana Purchase in the Lewis and Clark Expedition. His family took him to the Adirondack Mountains when he was six months old; they returned every summer for the next 25 years. After that, Marshall returned often on his own. His younger brother George (1904–2000) later described the family's visits to Knollwood, their summer camp on Lower Saranac Lake in the Adirondack State Park, as a time when they "entered a world of freedom and informality, of living plants and spaces, of fresh greens and exhilarating blues, of giant, slender pines and delicate pink twinflowers, of deer and mosquitoes, of fishing and guide boats and tramps through the woods".

== Schooling and early exploring ==
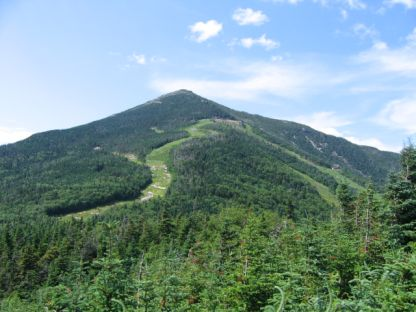
Whiteface Mountain, the fifth-highest mountain in New York and the first High Peak that Bob Marshall climbed in 1918

Marshall was drawn to the outdoors. He discovered his passion for exploring, charting, and a love of climbing mountains, in part through the writings of Verplanck Colvin, who during the post-Civil War decade surveyed the woods of northern New York. Throughout his life, Marshall kept a series of hiking notebooks, which he illustrated with photographs and filled with statistics. In 1915, Marshall climbed his first Adirondack peak, the 3,352-foot (1,022 m) Ampersand Mountain, alongside his brother George and family friend Herb Clark, a Saranac Lake guide. The two brothers learned the arts of woodcraft and boating through Clark, who accompanied them on most of their longer trips during adolescence and early adulthood. By 1921, they became the first climbers to scale all 42 Adirondack Mountains believed to exceed 4,000 feet (1,200 m), some of which had never been climbed. In 1924, the three became the first Adirondack Forty-Sixers, hikers who have climbed to the summits of all 46 High Peaks of the Adirondacks.

After graduating from the Ethical Culture School, Marshall spent a year at Columbia University. In 1920, he transferred to the New York State College of Forestry at Syracuse University. Marshall had decided in his teens that he wanted to be a forester, writing then about his love of "the woods and solitude;" he wrote that he "should hate to spend the greater part of my lifetime in a stuffy office or in a crowded city". For a while he was unhappy and withdrawn at Syracuse. But, he succeeded academically and was known for his individuality. As one classmate put it, Marshall was "always doing something no one else would ever think of doing. He was constantly rating things—the Adirondack peaks, his best days with George, and dozens of others." Marshall became a member of Alpha Xi Sigma, the forestry college's honor society. He ran on the Syracuse University freshman track team and participated in both junior varsity lacrosse and cross country running.

During the early 1920s, Marshall grew interested in promoting Adirondack recreation. In 1922, he became one of the charter members of the Adirondack Mountain Club (ADK), an organization devoted to the building and maintenance of trails and the teaching of hiking in the park. In 1922, he prepared a 38-page guidebook, entitled The High Peaks of the Adirondacks. Based on his pioneering experiences on the peaks, the guide recommends that "it's a great thing these days to leave civilization for a while and return to nature." Marshall provided a brief description of each peak and arranged them in order of "niceness of view and all around pleasure in view and climb."

In the early morning when the first faint light
Cuts the murky blackness of the cool calm night,
While the gloomy forest, dismal, dark, and wild,
Seems to slowly soften and become more mild,

When the mists hang heavy, where the streams flow by
And reflects the rose-tints in the eastern sky,
When the brook trout leaps and the deer drinks slow,
While the distant mountains blend in one soft glow,

'Tis the precious moment, given once a day,
When the present fades to the far-away,
When the busy this-time for a moment's gone,
And the Earth turns backward into Nature's dawn.

— Bob Marshall, Empire Forester (1923), yearbook of the New York State College of Forestry, p. 82

In 1924, Marshall graduated magna cum laude from Syracuse with a Bachelor of Science degree in forestry, finishing 4th of 59 at the College of Forestry. The senior yearbook described him as "the Champion Pond Hound of all time, a lad with a mania for statistics and shinnying mountain peaks, the boy who will go five miles [8 km] around to find something to wade thru. And the man who is rear chainman for Bob will have to hump or get wet, and probably both." By 1925, he earned a Master's degree in forestry from Harvard University.

== Forest Service and Alaska ==
Marshall started work in 1925 with the Forest Service, where he worked until 1928. Although he had hoped to go to Alaska, he was assigned that year to the Northern Rocky Mountain Experiment Station at Missoula, Montana. Marshall's research at the experimental station focused on the dynamics of forest regeneration after fires. He had to fight a widespread fire after a July storm started more than 150 fires in Idaho's Kaniksu National Forest. He was put in charge of supporting and provisioning one of the crews led by the Forest Service. As he later recalled, Marshall worked "18 to 20 hours a day as time-keeper, Chief of Commissary, Camp Boss, and Inspector of the fire line". Spending time with loggers and fire fighters, and seeing the conditions under which they worked, Marshall learned vital lessons about labor issues and natural resource use. At the experimental station, Marshall became interested in the unsafe conditions for many working Americans. He began to develop liberal and socialist philosophies.

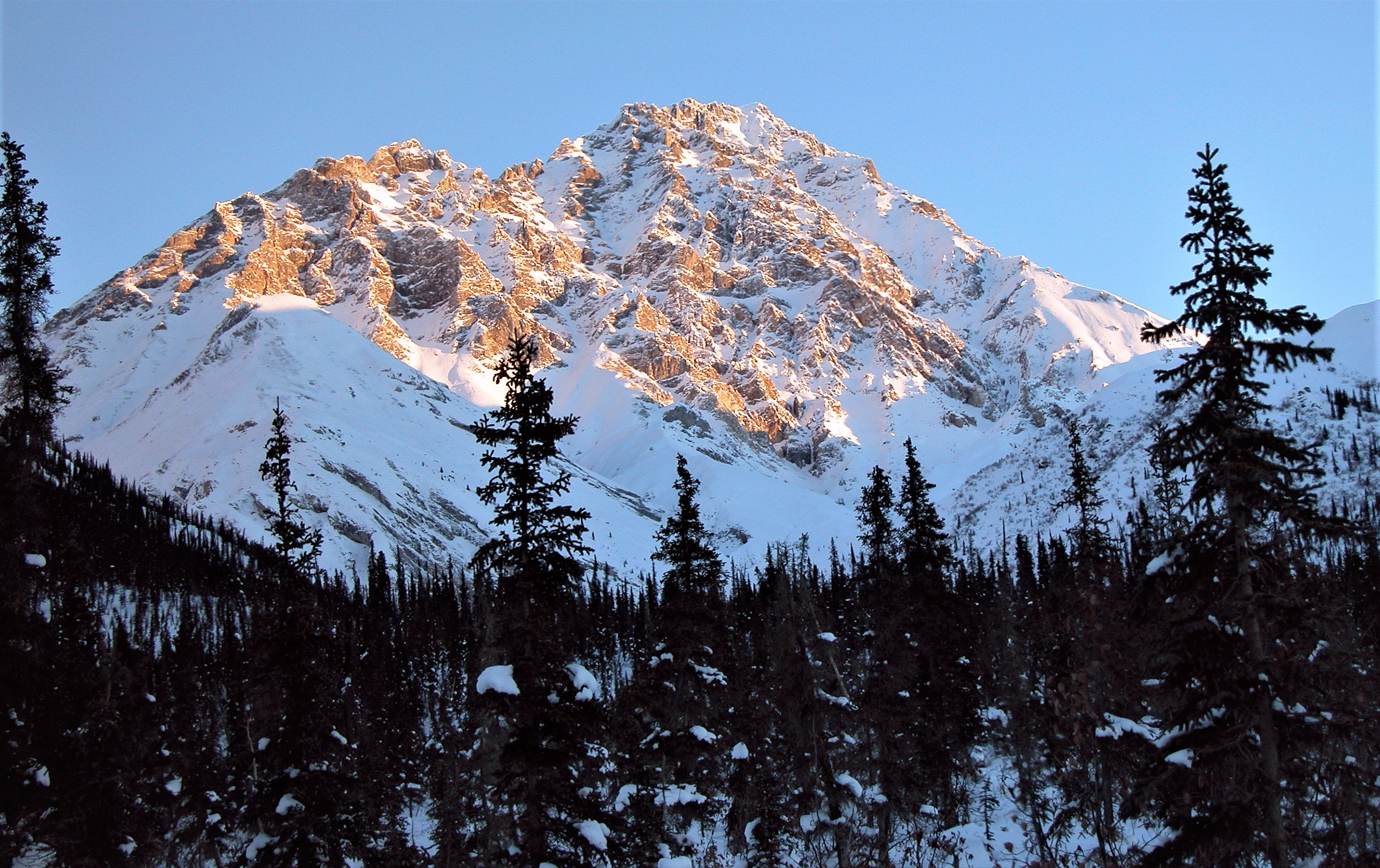
Snowden Mountain in the Brooks Range was named for Marshall's hunting partner.

After leaving the Forest Service in 1928, Marshall worked to complete his studies for a PhD in plant physiology at Johns Hopkins University in Baltimore, Maryland. The following year he made his first trip to Alaska, visiting the upper Koyukuk River and the central Brooks Range, and preparing for an extended stay for study. The scientific objective of the trip was to study tree growth at the northern timberline near the Arctic Divide. For his 15-month sojourn in the small town of Wiseman, Alaska, Marshall rented a one-room cabin next to the only roadhouse in the village. He furnished it with books, records, a phonograph player, and a writing desk. He placed the desk so that he could sit by the cabin's single window and admire the view of the Koyukuk River and the range of steep, snow-covered mountains in the background. His travels engendered in him a great love for the central Brooks Range in the Alaskan wilderness. Marshall was one of the first to explore much of the range, especially the headwaters of the North fork of the Koyukuk River, where he bestowed the name "Gates of the Arctic" on a pair of mountains, Boreal Mountain (6,375 ft) and Frigid Crags (5,501 ft).

Bob Marshall's mother died of cancer in 1916. In 1929, his father Louis died in Zürich, Switzerland at the age of 72. The four children inherited most of their father's estate, which was worth several million dollars. Although Marshall became financially independent, he continued to work throughout his life. He used his wealth to pursue his interests, such as The Wilderness Society, which he essentially supported in its early years.

In 1930, Marshall received his PhD under the supervision of Burton E. Livingston at the Johns Hopkins Laboratory of Plant Physiology. Marshall's doctoral dissertation was titled An Experimental Study of the Water Relations of Seedling Conifers with Special Reference to Wilting.

In February 1930, Marshall published an essay, "The Problem of the Wilderness," after it was rejected by four magazines. This is now celebrated as a defense of wilderness preservation, and the essay expanded themes developed in his earlier article, "The Wilderness as a Minority Right." Published in The Scientific Monthly, the essay is considered one of Marshall's most important works. He argued that wilderness was worth saving not only because of its unique aesthetic qualities, but because it could provide visitors with a chance for adventure. Marshall stated: "There is just one hope of repulsing the tyrannical ambition of civilization to conquer every niche on the whole earth. That hope is the organization of spirited people who will fight for the freedom of the wilderness." The article became a much-quoted call to action and by the late 20th century was considered seminal by wilderness historians.

In July 1930, Marshall and his brother George climbed nine Adirondack High Peaks in one day, setting a new record.

In August of that year, Marshall returned to Alaska. He planned to explore the Brooks Range to pursue more tree research, and he also wanted to study the Arctic frontier society of Wiseman. He described the village, which was 200 miles north of Fairbanks, as "the happiest civilization of which I have knowledge." Befriending a number of the area's inhabitants, he meticulously recorded thousands of hours of conversation with them. Marshall persuaded a number of villagers, most of whom were single males, to take intelligence tests. He also recorded statistics on all aspects of the villagers' lives, from their financial resources to their diets to their sexual habits. He spent 12-1/2 months—from late August 1930 to early September 1931—exploring and collecting data. From this work (and his previous trip to Alaska), he wrote Arctic Village, a sociological study of life in the wilderness. Published in 1933 the book was selected by the Literary Guild and became a bestseller. Marshall shared the royalties from the book with the residents of Wiseman.

== Writing, conservation, and federal government ==
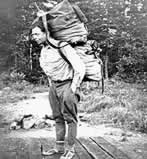
Marshall in the Quetico-Superior area, 1937

Marshall returned to the East Coast in late September 1931. Although he was writing Arctic Village, he also wrote prolifically on other topics and published several articles about American forestry. In particular, he was concerned that few articles of this time addressed the issue of deforestation, and he wrote a letter to the president of the American Forestry Association, George D. Pratt, on the matter. He also pursued a variety of other activities: he accepted an invitation to serve on a committee to dedicate a memorial (Louis Marshall Memorial Hall) to his father at the forestry college in Syracuse. He lectured in various cities, delivering speeches about his travels and wilderness preservation.

Shortly after his return, Marshall was asked by Earle Clapp, head of the Forest Service's Branch of Research, to help initiate badly needed reforms in the forest-products industry and to create a broader vision of national forest management. Marshall moved to Washington, D.C. in September 1932 to assume the appointed position, which entailed writing initiatives for forest recreation. He immediately began compiling a list of the remaining roadless areas in the United States. He sent this data to regional foresters, urging them to set aside areas for wilderness; all of them responded negatively. Marshall's contributions to what became known as the Copeland Report amounted to three extensive chapters of a two-volume, 1,677-page work. He considered it "the best piece of forestry work I have yet done."

During the depths of the Great Depression in 1932–1933, Marshall had defined himself as a socialist. He told a correspondent: "I wish very sincerely that Socialism would be put into effect right away and the profit system eliminated." He became active in the Tenants Unemployed League of the District of Columbia, a group that helped unemployed people with housing problems; later he joined the fight against federal aid cuts to scientific research. Having learned of the American Civil Liberties Union from his father, he served as chairman of the Washington, DC chapter. Marshall was arrested and briefly held for participating in a March 1933 United Front demonstration.

Marshall did not forget his conservation causes, and soon was pondering the question of wilderness and national parks. In the early 1930s, he joined the National Parks Association, eventually becoming a member of its board.

In 1933, Marshall published The People's Forests [On Forestry in America], in which he "made a forceful case for socializing the nation's industrial timberlands." He believed that public ownership was the "best way to ensure both the sustainability of the forest industry and the preservation of wilderness."

In August 1933, Marshall was appointed as director of the Forestry Division of the Bureau of Indian Affairs (BIA), a position he held for four years. The BIA managed the resources of many Indian reservation lands, deciding on logging and other leases for resource extraction. This was before many tribes asserted their sovereignty and took over their own management of their lands. Marshall besieged government personnel with letters, telephone calls, and personal visits in the cause of wilderness, rapidly gaining recognition in Washington as a champion of preservation. One of his last initiatives as chief forester of the BIA was to recommend designation of 4,800,000 acres (19,425 km^{2}) of Indian reservation lands for federal management as either "roadless" or "wild" areas. The administrative order, which created 16 wilderness areas, received approval shortly after Marshall left the BIA to join the Forest Service again. He was appointed to a political position there as well.

Marshall became increasingly concerned with civilization's encroachment upon the wild lands, writing:

The sounds of the forest are entirely obliterated by the roar of the motor. The smell of pine needles and flowers and herbs and freshly turned dirt and all the other delicate odors of the forest are drowned in the stench of gasoline. The feeling of wind blowing in the face and of soft ground under foot are all lost.

== Wilderness Society ==
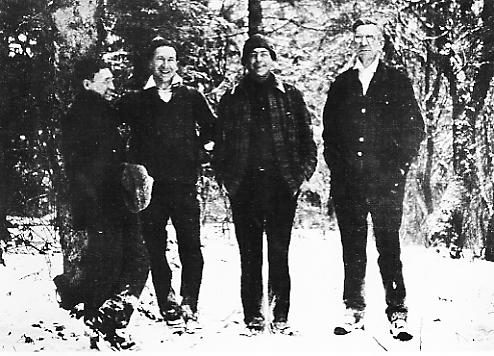
Four founders of The Wilderness Society: Bernard Frank, Harvey Broome, Bob Marshall, and Benton MacKaye. Picture taken in the Smokies on January 26, 1936

In 1934, Marshall visited Knoxville, Tennessee, and met with Benton MacKaye, a regional planner who gained support to designate and lay out the Appalachian Trail. Together with Harvey Broome, a Knoxville lawyer, they discussed Marshall's 1930 proposal for an organization dedicated to wilderness preservation. Bernard Frank, a fellow forester, joined them later in the year; the men mailed an "Invitation to Help Organize a Group to Preserve the American Wilderness" to like-minded individuals. The invitation expressed their desire "to integrate the growing sentiment which we believe exists in this country for holding wild areas sound-proof as well as sight-proof from our increasingly mechanized life," and their conviction that such wildernesses were "a serious human need rather than a luxury and plaything".

On January 21, 1935, the organizing committee published a folder stating that "for the purpose of fighting off invasion of the wilderness and of stimulating ... an appreciation of its multiform emotional, intellectual, and scientific values, we are forming an organization to be known as the WILDERNESS SOCIETY". They invited Aldo Leopold to act as the society's first president, but the position ultimately went to Robert Sterling Yard. Marshall provided the bulk of the society's funding in its early years, beginning with an anonymous donation of $1,000.

T. H. Watkins, who later edited the society's magazine, Wilderness, contended that before Marshall and the Society there was "no true movement" for the preservation of the nation's roadless and primitive areas. "One could comfortably argue," Watkins wrote in 1985 on the occasion of the society's 50th anniversary, "that Robert Marshall was personally responsible for the preservation of more wilderness than any individual in history".

== Later efforts and sudden death ==
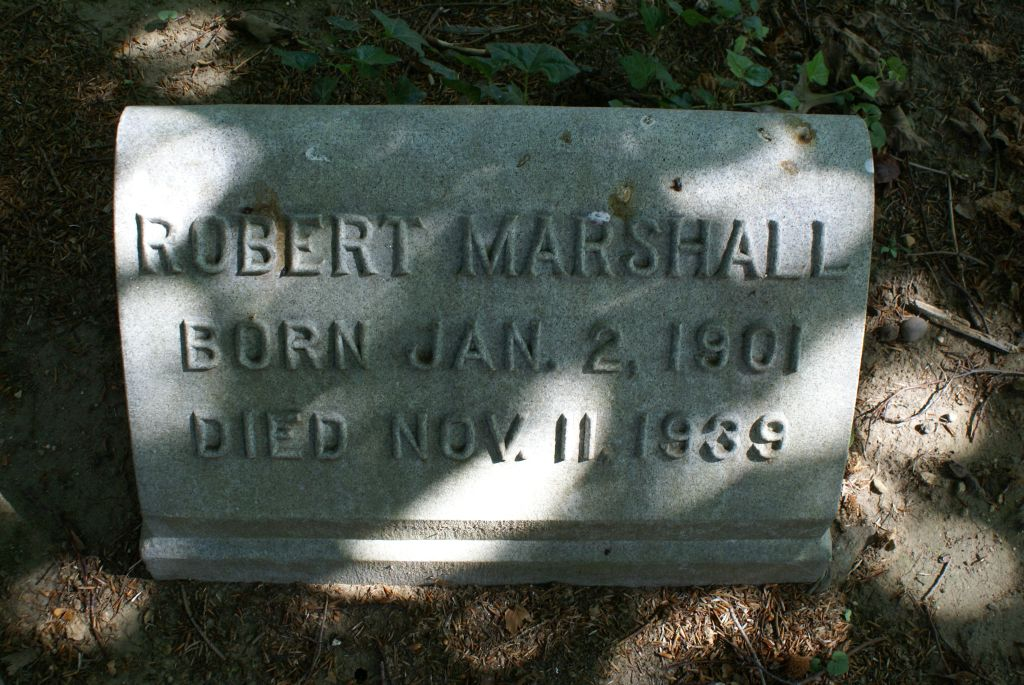
Bob Marshall's footstone

Marshall's last years were productive. By May 1937, he was appointed as director of the Forest Service's Division of Recreation and Lands. Over the next two years, Marshall worked on two major initiatives: an effort to extend national forest recreational opportunities to people with lower incomes (as well as dismantling discriminatory barriers against ethnic minorities), and a program to preserve more wilderness within the national forests. His biographer James Glover asserts that Marshall was probably the first high-level official to seriously fight ethnic discrimination in Forest Service recreational policies, at a time when racial segregation of public facilities was law throughout the Southern states and in some other states. During this time, Marshall continued to financially support The Wilderness Society, as well as various civil rights, labor, and socialist organizations.

In August 1938, Marshall began his last trip to Alaska, which included further exploration of the Brooks Range. He became a subject of interest of the House Un-American Activities Committee, a House of Representatives committee investigating "un-American" activities. Known as the Dies Committee for its chairman, Martin Dies, the committee announced in The New York Times that eight federal officials (including Marshall) were contributing to communism because of their connections to such organizations as the Workers Alliance and the American League for Peace and Democracy. Marshall was too busy traveling to respond to the allegations: after leaving Alaska he spent time in Washington state, Montana, Oregon, Nevada, Utah, Arizona, New Mexico and California. He visited Alaska for one last time the following year and made a tour of western national forests, addressing aspects of forest recreation.

While Marshall was in Washington State that September, two regulations (U-1 and U2) developed by his Forest Service committee were signed by Secretary of Agriculture Henry A. Wallace; these "U-Regulations" protected wilderness and wild areas from road building, logging, hotels, and similarly destructive activities. It made their protected status more secure.

While on a midnight train from Washington, D.C. to New York City on November 11, 1939, Marshall died of apparent heart failure at the age of 38. His sudden death came as a shock because of his relatively young age and high level of physical activity. He was greatly mourned by friends and relatives. His brother George (who lived to be 96) said: "Bob's death shattered me and was the most traumatic event in my life." Marshall was interred at Salem Fields Cemetery, a Jewish burial ground in Brooklyn, New York City, beside his parents and sister Ruth (Putey) Marshall, who had died of congestive heart failure at age 38 in 1936.

== Legacy ==
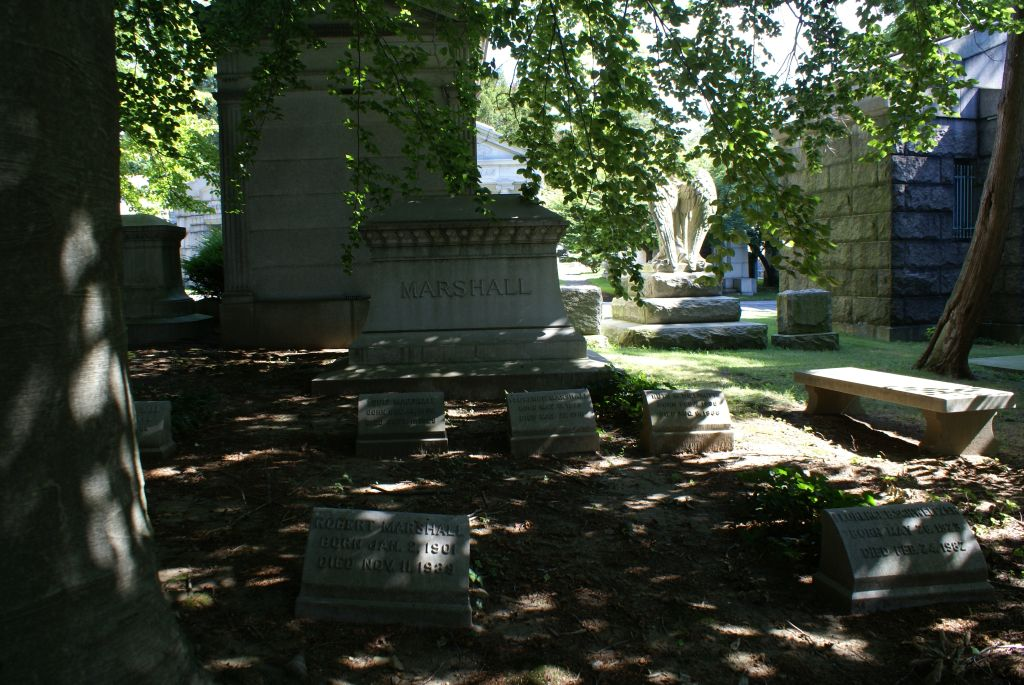
The shady burial site of the Marshall family in Salem Fields Cemetery

A bachelor, Marshall left virtually all of his $1.5 million estate (equivalent to $34 million today) to three causes dear to him: wilderness preservation, socialism, civil liberties. Three trusts were established in his will. The first, focused on education related to "the theory of production for use and not for profit", received half of his estate. This was the motto of the League for Industrial Democracy, a social democratic group which he supported during his lifetime, but the funds actually distributed reportedly went to National Negro Congress, National Federation for Constitutional Liberties, and other such groups, which were subsumed into the Civil Rights Congress in 1946. The second, aimed at "safeguarding and advancement of the cause of civil liberties", received one-quarter of his estate; and the third supported "preservation of the wilderness conditions in outdoor America," establishing what became the Robert Marshall Wilderness Fund. Trustees of the latter trust included Robert Sterling Yard, Bob Marshall's brother George, Irving Clark, Olaus Murie and Bill Zimmerman, early leaders of The Wilderness Society. Marshall left money to only one individual: $10,000 (equivalent to $228,723 today) to his old friend and guide, Herb Clark.

Marshall's posthumously published book Alaska Wilderness, Exploring the Central Brooks Range (1956), edited by his brother George, became a seminal work. It inspired the establishment of the Gates of the Arctic National Park. His Adirondack writings were published by Lost Pond Press in 2006, as an anthology titled Bob Marshall in the Adirondacks: Writings of a Pioneering Peak-Bagger, Pond-Hopper and Wilderness Preservationist. It was edited by Phil Brown, editor of the Adirondack Explorer news magazine. According to the publisher, the book includes "numerous accounts of his hikes in the High Peaks and the vast wild region south of Cranberry Lake, spirited defenses of the state's forever-wild Forest Preserve, a charming portrait of Herb Clark, and excerpts from an unpublished novel set partly in the Adirondacks".

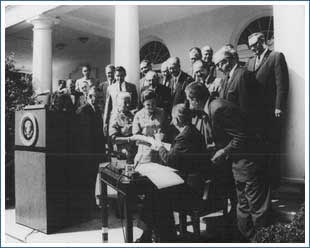
President Lyndon Johnson signing the Wilderness Act of 1964 in the Rose Garden of the White House as wilderness activists look on

Since its founding, The Wilderness Society has helped pass many bills for preservation and conservation of public lands. It has also purchased lands for preservation, contributing a total of 109 million acres (421,000 km^{2}) to the National Wilderness Preservation System. Marshall's dream of permanent wilderness protection became a reality 25 years after his death when President Lyndon B. Johnson signed the Wilderness Act into law on September 3, 1964, in the Rose Garden of the White House.

Written by Howard Zahniser—who died of a heart attack at age 58 four months before the bill was signed into law— the legislation authorized the United States Congress to set aside a total of 9 million acres in selected areas in the national forests, national parks, national wildlife refuges, and other federal lands as units to be kept permanently unchanged by humans. It also provided for more acreage to be designated as wilderness for preservation. In defining wilderness, Zahniser invoked Marshall and his contemporaries, stating that "in contrast with those areas where man and his own works dominate the landscape, [wilderness] is hereby recognized as an area where the earth and its community of life are untrammeled by man, where man himself is a visitor who does not remain." The act's signing was the most important event in the history of The Wilderness Society; members Mardy Murie and Alice Zahniser stood beside Johnson as he signed the legislation. With the Wilderness Act, the United States guaranteed permanent protection of wild and scenic natural areas for future generations.

=== Places and dedications ===
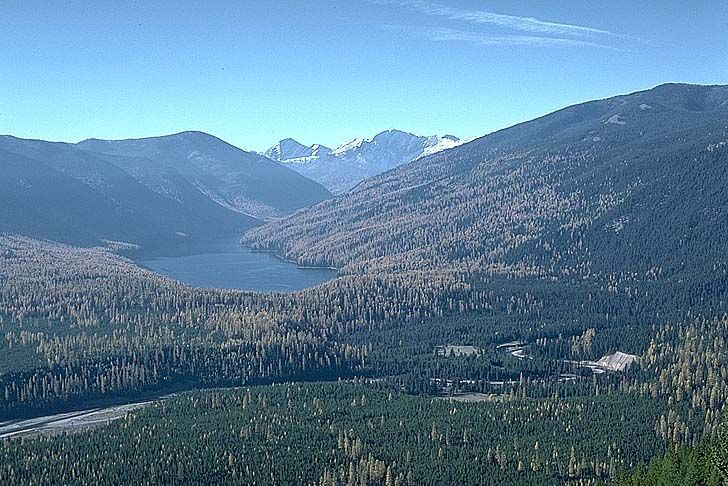
Big Salmon Lake in the Bob Marshall Wilderness

The Bob Marshall Wilderness, an area located in Flathead and Lewis and Clark national forests in Montana, was created in the same year (1964) that the Wilderness Act became law. It had previously been set aside in 1941 as the South Fork, Pentagon, and Sun River Primitive Areas. The area encompasses a million acres (4,000 km^{2}) and is one of the best-preserved ecosystems in the world. Known as "The Bob," it is the fifth-largest wilderness in the contiguous 48 states (Death Valley is the largest). In compliance with the 1964 Wilderness Act, no motorized or mechanical equipment (including bicycles or hang gliders) is permitted. Although camping and fishing are allowed with proper permit, the area is roadless, and logging and mining are prohibited. There are numerous U.S. Forest Service cabins in The Bob for use by Forest Service personnel. The Bob Marshall Wilderness Complex (which encompasses Bob Marshall, Scapegoat, and Great Bear Wildernesses) is a habitat for the grizzly bear, lynx, cougar, wolf, black bear, moose, elk and a variety of other birds, mammals, and plants.

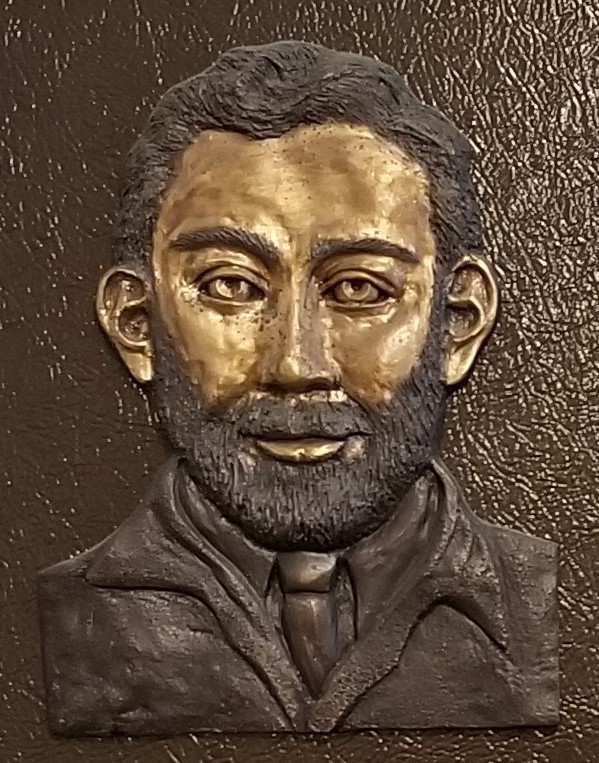
Commemorative plaque of Bob Marshall, SUNY-ESF, Syracuse, NY

Mount Marshall (previously called Mount Herbert), which stands 4,360 feet (1,330 m) high in the Adirondack Mountains, Camp Bob Marshall in the Black Hills, and Marshall Lake in the Brooks Range of Alaska, north of the Arctic Circle, are also named for him. In 2008, the Adirondack Council was encouraging the state of New York to create the Bob Marshall Great Wilderness near Cranberry Lake in the western Adirondacks; if successful, it would be the largest wilderness area in the Adirondack Park at 409,000 acres (639 sq mi; 1,655 km^{2}).

At the State University of New York College of Environmental Science and Forestry (SUNY-ESF), Bob Marshall Fellowships in wilderness management and policy studies are offered to graduate students and faculty engaged in research in recreation resource management; the fellowships are supported by the college's Bob Marshall Endowed Fund. Also at ESF, a student "outing club" named after Marshall honors his love of the outdoors and the Adirondack mountains. A bronze plaque commemorating Bob Marshall's contributions to wilderness conservation was installed in the entrance of Marshall Hall, a hub of campus events and activities named after his father.

== Selected works ==
=== Articles ===
- "The Wilderness as a Minority Right", U.S. Forest Service Bulletin (August 27, 1928), pp. 5–6.
- "Forest devastation must stop", The Nation (August 28, 1929)
- "The Problem of the Wilderness", The Scientific Monthly (February 1930), pp. 141–148
- "A Proposed Remedy for Our Forest Illness", Journal of Forestry 28 (March 1930)
- "The Social Management of American Forests", League for Industrial Democracy (1930)

=== Books ===
- Arctic Village. New York: The Literary Guild (1933)

reprinted by the University of Alaska Press, Fairbanks, 1991. ISBN 978-0-912006-51-2)

- The People's Forests. [On Forestry in America.]. New York: H. Smith and R. Haas (1933) LCCN 33-36029

reprint (with a foreword by Mike Dombeck) by the University of Iowa Press, Iowa City, 2002. ISBN 978-0-87745-805-0)

- Alaska Wilderness: Exploring the Central Brooks Range, 2nd ed. Berkeley: University of California Press (1970) LCCN 73-116025 ISBN 978-0-520-01710-8; Marshall, Robert (2005). 3rd edition. University of California Press. ISBN 0-520-24498-2; pbk with a new foreword by Rick Bass

(first published as Arctic Wilderness, in 1956) LCCN 56-6774
