= Harvey Broome =

American lawyer (1902–1968)

- Born: Harvey Benjamin Broome; July 15, 1902; Knoxville, Tennessee, USA
- Died: March 8, 1968 (aged 65); Knoxville, Tennessee, USA
- Education: University of Tennessee (1923); Harvard Law School (1926)
- Occupation: Lawyer
- Years active: 1928–1968
- Notable work: Harvey Broome: Earth Man (1970); Faces of the Wilderness (1972); Out Under the Sky of the Great Smokies: A Personal Journal (1975)
- Spouse: Anna Waller Pursel
- Parent(s): George and Adelaide Smith Broome

Harvey Benjamin Broome (July 15, 1902 – March 8, 1968) was an American lawyer, writer and conservationist. A native of Knoxville, Tennessee, Broome was a founding member of The Wilderness Society, for which he served as president from 1957 until his death in 1968, and played a key role in the establishment of the Great Smoky Mountains National Park. The Knoxville Group of the Tennessee Chapter of the Sierra Club is named the "Harvey Broome Group" in his honor.

== Early life and career ==
Broome was born in Knoxville to George W. and Adeline Broome on July 15, 1902. During his childhood, he frequently visited his grandparents' farm in Fountain City (now a suburb of Knoxville). Located 40 miles north of the Great Smoky Mountains, it was here that Broome developed his love of the outdoors. At the age of fifteen, his father took him on his first camping trip, to Silers Bald in the Smokies.

After graduating from Knoxville High School in 1919, Broome attended the University of Tennessee, graduating in 1923. Three years later, he earned a law degree from Harvard University. Although he began his law career as a clerk, he eventually entered into private practice with a law firm in Oak Ridge, Tennessee called Kramer, Dye, McNabb and Greenwood. Realizing after several years that the life of a clerk had provided him with more time to spend in the outdoors, Broome left the firm to return to his former position. He clerked for federal district court judge Xen Hicks from 1930 to 1949, and for Judge Robert L. Taylor from 1958 to 1968.

== Conservation ==
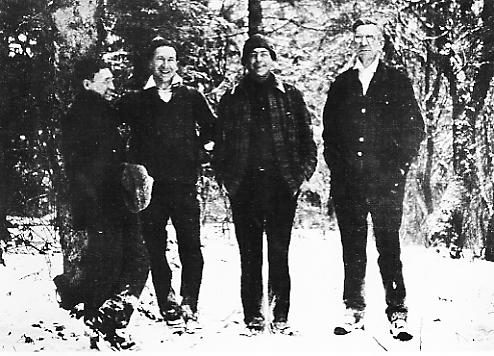
Four founders of The Wilderness Society: (l-r) Bernard Frank, Harvey Broome, Bob Marshall, and Benton MacKaye

In October 1934, while attending a forestry conference in the Smokies, Broome met fellow conservationists Bob Marshall, Benton MacKaye and Bernard Frank, all of whom shared a common interest in the need for an organization to protect America's wilderness areas. Three months later, The Wilderness Society was created; Broome would be heavily involved in the Society for the remainder of his life. Among his achievements was his work alongside Society executive director Howard Zahniser in persuading the United States Congress to create the National Wilderness Preservation System, which occurred in 1964 when Congress passed the Wilderness Act. Broome was present among other conservationists when President Lyndon Johnson signed the bill into law on September 3, 1964. He also wrote a letter detailing his predictions of the future of forest preservation, which is to be opened by the President of the United States on October 24, 1964.

In the mid-1930s, Broome was director of the Great Smoky Mountains Conservation Association. While he advocated the creation of the park, he disagreed with Park Commission president David C. Chapman, who wanted to develop the park as a tourist attraction. Broome wanted the park strictly preserved as a wilderness, with access provided via hiking trails.

In 1954, Broome was one of several conservationists (among them Justice William O. Douglas) to hike the Chesapeake and Ohio Canal towpath in protest of plans to convert the towpath into a road. In the mid-1960s, he helped establish the Save-Our-Smokies campaign, mainly to oppose the construction of a trans-mountain road through the park.

Broome published his first article, "Great Smoky Mountain Trails," in Mountain magazine in 1928. In subsequent years, he contributed numerous articles to various publications, including Living Wilderness (The Wilderness Society's publication), National Parks Magazine, and Nature, among others. Three of his books were published posthumously: Out Under the Skies in the Great Smoky Mountains, Faces of the Wilderness, and Harvey Broome: Earth Man.

Broome served as president of the East Tennessee Historical Society from 1945 to 1947. During this period, the Society published its first comprehensive history of Knoxville and Knox County, The French Broad-Holston County: A History of Knox County, Tennessee, which was edited by Lawson McGhee librarian Mary Rothrock. Broome provided three chapters for the book detailing the history of Knox County's government.

== Personal life ==
Broome married his wife Anna, who shared his love of the outdoors, in 1937. They lived in a house that the couple relocated from Broome's grandfather's farm to Knoxville; they also owned a cabin in the Smokies. Harvey Broome died of a heart attack on March 8, 1968, while building a birdhouse out of a hollow log.

In his will, Broome left his papers and library to the McClung Historical Collection, a department of the Knox County Public Library System in Knoxville, Tennessee. Anne Broome donated additional papers, correspondence and writings. There are 55 boxes in the collection.

== Notes ==
=== References ===
- Sutter, Paul. 2002. Driven Wild: How the Fight against Automobiles Launched the Modern Wilderness Movement. Seattle: University of Washington press. ISBN 0-295-98219-5.
