= The Wilderness Society (United States) =

American non-profit land conservation organization

- Formation: April 30, 1937; 89 years ago
- Founders: Bob Marshall, Benton MacKaye, Aldo Leopold, Bernard Frank, Robert Sterling Yard, Harvey Broome
- Tax ID no.: 53-0167933
- Legal status: 501(c)(3) nonprofit organization
- Headquarters: 1801 Pennsylvania Ave NW, 2nd Floor, Washington, D.C. 20006, U.S.
- Coordinates: 38.905927°N 77.037329°W
- Members: 1+ million
- President: Tracy Stone-Manning
- Subsidiaries: The Wilderness Society Action Fund _{(501(c)(4))}
- Revenue: $42,032,659 (2024)
- Expenses: $43,478,669 (2024)
- Endowment: $93,338,312 _{(2024)}
- Employees: 165 (2016)
- Volunteers: 125 (2016)
- Website: www.wilderness.org

The Wilderness Society is an American non-profit land conservation organization that is dedicated to protecting natural areas and federal public lands in the United States. They advocate for the designation of federal wilderness areas and other protective designations, such as for national monuments. They support balanced uses of public lands, and advocate for federal politicians to enact various land conservation and balanced land use proposals. The Wilderness Society also engages in a number of ancillary activities – including education, outreach, and hosts one of the most valuable collections of Ansel Adams photographs at their headquarters in Washington, D.C.

The Wilderness Society specializes in issues involving lands under the management of federal agencies. These lands include national parks, national forests, national wildlife refuges, and areas overseen by the Bureau of Land Management. Since the early 21st century, the society has actively fought recent political efforts to reduce protection for America's roadless, undeveloped lands and wildlife.

The organization was instrumental in the passage of the 1964 Wilderness Act. The Wilderness Act led to the creation of the National Wilderness Preservation System, which protects 109 million acres of U.S. public wildlands.

== Founding ==
The Wilderness Society was incorporated on April 30, 1937, by a group of eight men who would later become some of the 20th century's most prominent conservationists.

=== Founders ===
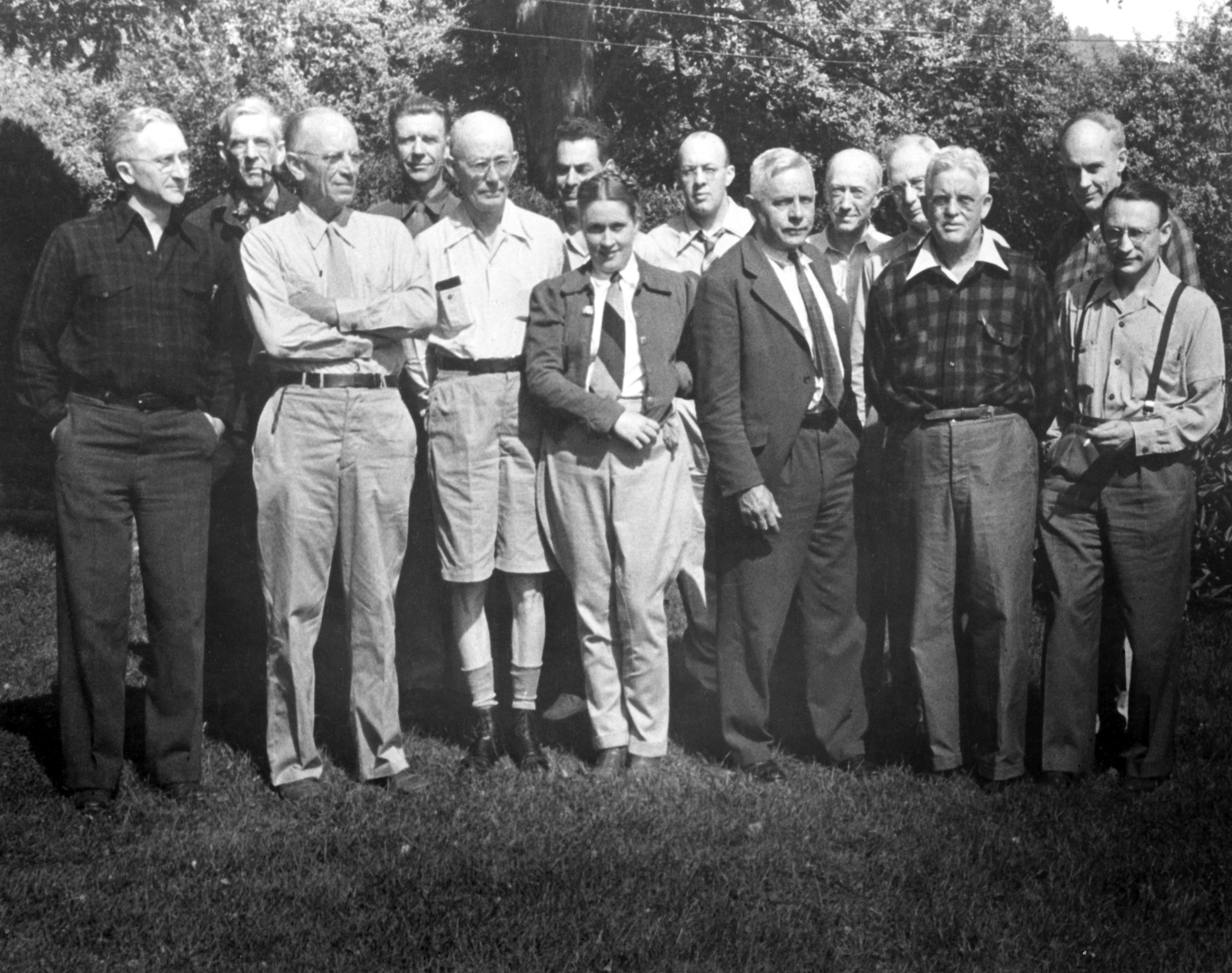
Founders at Old Rag Mountain, VA in 1946

On April 30, 1937, The Wilderness Society was incorporated by eight men who would later become prominent conservationists of the 20th century.

- Bob Marshall: chief of recreation and lands for the United States Forest Service
- Aldo Leopold: noted wildlife ecologist and later author of A Sand County Almanac
- Robert Sterling Yard: publicist for the National Park Service and the Society's first secretary and editor of its magazine, The Living Wilderness
- Benton MacKaye: the "Father of the Appalachian Trail"
- Ernest Oberholtzer: proponent of the Quetico-Superior wilderness area
- Harvey Broome: a key player in the creation of Great Smoky Mountains National Park
- Bernard Frank: a leader in creating the Rock Creek Watershed Association in Washington, D.C., and the Chesapeake and Ohio Canal National Historic Park in Washington, D.C., Virginia and Maryland
- Harold C. Anderson: a leading member of the Potomac Appalachian Trail club.

Among these eight founders, Bob Marshall is credited with financing the beginning of the organization via donations from his independent wealth. Additionally, Marshall set up a trust through his estate to provide future revenues to The Wilderness Society. After he died at the age of 38 in 1939, The Wilderness Society began to receive such revenues.

=== Notable associates ===
- Olaus Murie – biologist who joined the organization's governing council in 1937, and became president of the Society in 1950. Under Murie's leadership, the Society lobbied successfully for the prevention of large federal dam projects near Glacier National Park and Dinosaur National Monument. During his presidency, the Muries' ranch in Moose, Wyoming, became an unofficial headquarters for The Wilderness Society.
- Sigurd Olson – author of the novel The Singing Wilderness and former president and governing council member
- Celia Hunter – founder of the Alaska Conservation Society and the first woman elected as president of the Society in 1976; previously served on the governing council
- Howard Zahniser – author of The Wilderness Act of 1964 – joined The Wilderness Society in 1945, served for two decades, first as executive secretary and editor of the organization's magazine The Living Wilderness; later he served as the organization's executive director.

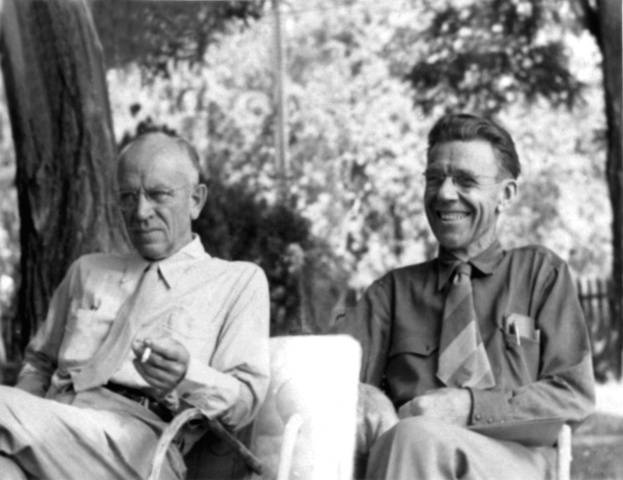
Leopold and Murie in 1946

- Mardy Murie – conservationist and Alaska advocate, former governing council member. Known as the "grandmother of the conservation movement," Mardy Murie was instrumental in the designating of the Alaska National Wildlife Refuge as a protected wilderness area. Additionally, she documented much of her experiences in her books, including Two in the Far North. These novels often featured stories of her experience in nature with her husband Olaus. In 1964, Mardy Murie attended the signing of the Wilderness Act.
- Gaylord Nelson – former US Senator from Wisconsin and founder of Earth Day – served as counselor to The Wilderness Society
- Wallace Stegner – author of fiction novels set in the Western United States, former governing council member
- Ansel Adams – photographer and conservationist, former governing council member
- Deanna Archuleta – former southwest regional director of The Wilderness Society, former Deputy Assistant Secretary for Water and Science at the Department of Interior
- Stewart M. Brandborg – executive director from 1964 to 1976 during which time more than 70 wilderness areas in 31 states were brought under the Wilderness Act's protection.
- Ernie Dickerman – focused on preserving wilderness in the eastern United States, The Wilderness Society staff from 1956 to 1976, Virginia Wilderness Committee president from 1976 to 1979, "Grandfather of Eastern Wilderness."

== Achievements ==
=== The Wilderness Act of 1964 ===
The Wilderness Act is considered one of America's bedrock conservation laws and was written by The Wilderness Society's former Executive Director Howard Zahniser. Passed by Congress in 1964, the Wilderness Act created the National Wilderness Preservation System, which now protects nearly 110 million acres of designated wilderness areas throughout the United States. Among the first wilderness areas created by the act were: Boundary Waters Canoe Area Wilderness, Minnesota; Bridger Wilderness, Wyoming; Bob Marshall Wilderness, Montana; and Ansel Adams Wilderness, California.

In The Wilderness Act, Zahniser defines the word wilderness as "an area where the earth and its community of life are untrammeled by man, where man himself is a visitor who does not remain". This word choice is important because it implies that the areas deemed wilderness would be "unconfined, uncontrolled, unrestrained, or unmanipulated [by humans]." By clearly defining the word, The Wilderness Act provided a guideline for how to determine what exactly wilderness is and how it is to be treated. Maybe controversially, under this definition, The Wilderness Act permits natural disasters, like forest fires, to ensue naturally. Only in the event that the fire is going to spread out of the boundary of the wilderness, then the act allows it to be controlled. This idea of letting nature take its course also includes prohibiting beneficial manipulation of the wilderness, such as restocking a lake full of a struggling fish species. This again is a direct implication of how the word wilderness was defined.

The "A Wilderness Forever-Future" article talks about the way that the Wilderness was a roadless where people can't go or stay there. That it can be changed when people decide to build road. it also talk about the Wilderness Act and how it was affect in that period of time. It also talks about how the Wilderness society in that time period was created and had a cause to help the government make an Wilderness act to keep the national parks safe. So that they are not harmed in a way will keep the historical meaning behind it.

=== More than 109 million acres designated as wilderness ===
The Wilderness Society has campaigned for the passage of wilderness bills as a means to permanently protect significant and unspoiled wildlands in the United States. Since the passage of the Wilderness Act in 1964, the National Wilderness Preservation System has grown to more than 109 million acres.

=== Passage of conservation laws ===
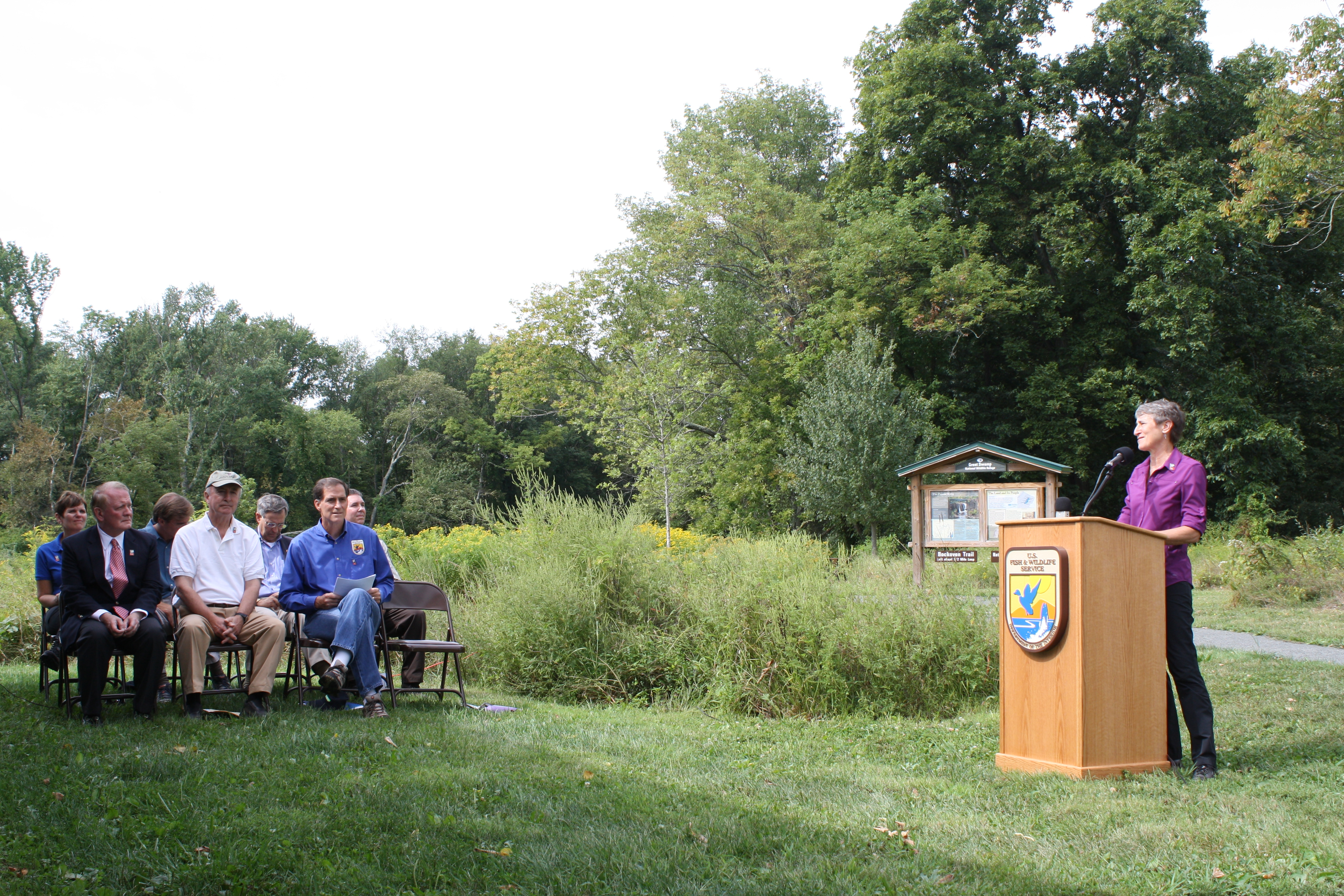
Wilderness Society President Jamie Williams (seated) at an event celebrating 50 years of wilderness, 2014

One of The Wilderness Society's specialties is creating coalitions consisting of environmental groups, as well as representatives of sportsmen, ranchers, scientists, business owners, and others. It states that it bases its work in science and economic analysis, often enabling conservationists to strengthen the case for land protection by documenting potential scientific and economic dividends.

The Wilderness Society played a major role in passage of the following bills:

- Wilderness Act (1964)
- Wild and Scenic Rivers Act (1968)
- National Trails System Act (1968)
- Eastern Wilderness Areas Act (1975)
- National Forest Management Act (1976)
- Alaska National Interest Lands Conservation Act (1980)
- Tongass Timber Reform Act (1990)
- California Desert Protection Act (1994)
- National Wildlife Refuge System Improvement Act (1997)
- The Public Lands Omnibus Act (2009), which added wilderness areas in nine states to the wilderness system.

=== Major court cases ===
- Alyeska Pipeline Service Co. v. The Wilderness Society-- This U.S. Supreme Court case involved the Alyeska Pipeline, which runs from the north to the south in Alaska. The Wilderness Society wanted to stop construction on the pipeline. They argued that it would damage the environment and violate the National Environmental Policy Act (NEPA). The Supreme Court ruled in favor of the Alyeska Pipeline Company. This allowed the pipeline to proceed with its construction.
- Wilderness Society v. Kane County-- This case involved the Wilderness Society, which challenged a decision made by Kane County, Utah, that allowed off-road vehicle use on public lands. The Wilderness Society argued that the off-road vehicle use violated the Federal Land Policy and Management Act, which requires proper management of public lands to prevent environmental harm. The case centered around land use and conservation efforts. The court ended up siding with Kane County, determining that the county's management plan did not violate federal laws.
- In both of these lawsuits, The Wilderness Society lost the case. They are still important to address because it shows the Society's actions toward environmental causes via the legal system.

=== Significant accomplishments ===
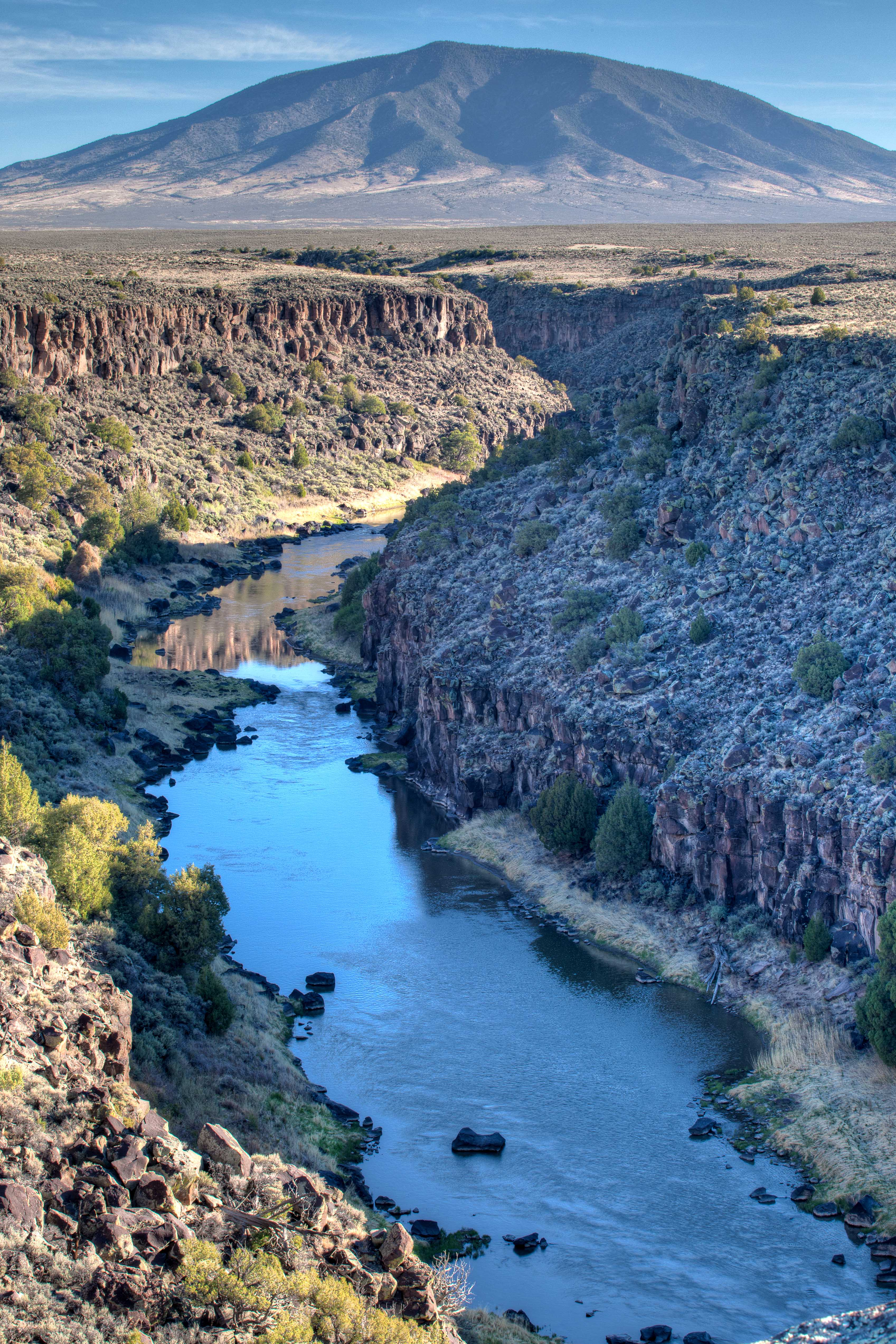
Ute Mountain and upper Rio Grande gorge

- Developed the first maps of remaining old-growth forests in the Pacific Northwest; this demonstrated the decline in such areas, and provided a factual basis for a national campaign to preserve the ancient forests of the Pacific Northwest;
- Helped gain congressional appropriations from the Land and Water Conservation Fund to add millions of acres of wildlands to local, state, and federal parks, forests, and refuges through congressional appropriations;
- Produced the first scientifically valid assessment of the status and range of Pacific salmon stocks in California, Oregon, Washington and Idaho, contributing to the emergence of salmon conservation as a major national conservation priority;
- Played a significant role in establishing forest land conservation as a priority in New England and helped organize the Northern Forest Alliance, more than 40 organizations working to preserve open space, sustainable forests, and wildlands;
- Advocated for passage of the Public Lands Omnibus Act (2009), which added wilderness areas in nine states to the wilderness system – a sweeping package of wilderness bills that protected more than 2 million acres of wilderness in nine states and thousands of miles of rivers in the wild and scenic river system;
- Successfully persuaded the government to protect sensitive habitat for caribou and other wildlife in the National Petroleum Reserve-Alaska from oil and gas drilling, and helped move a bill to Congress to protect the coastal plain of the Arctic National Wildlife Refuge;
- Gained designations of new national monuments, including: Colorado's Browns Canyon, New Mexico's Rio Grande del Norte; Washington's San Juan Islands, Colorado's Chimney Rock, and California's Fort Ord;
- Won a roll-back of numerous oil and gas leases made around Arches National Park and other wild Utah red rock lands during the end of the George W. Bush administration;
- Pushed the U.S. Bureau of Land Management to institute significant oil and gas leasing reforms, including a new planning tool, called a Master Leasing Plan, which requires a full examination of a landscape for all of its values before determining how oil and gas development can occur.

== Issues and campaigns ==
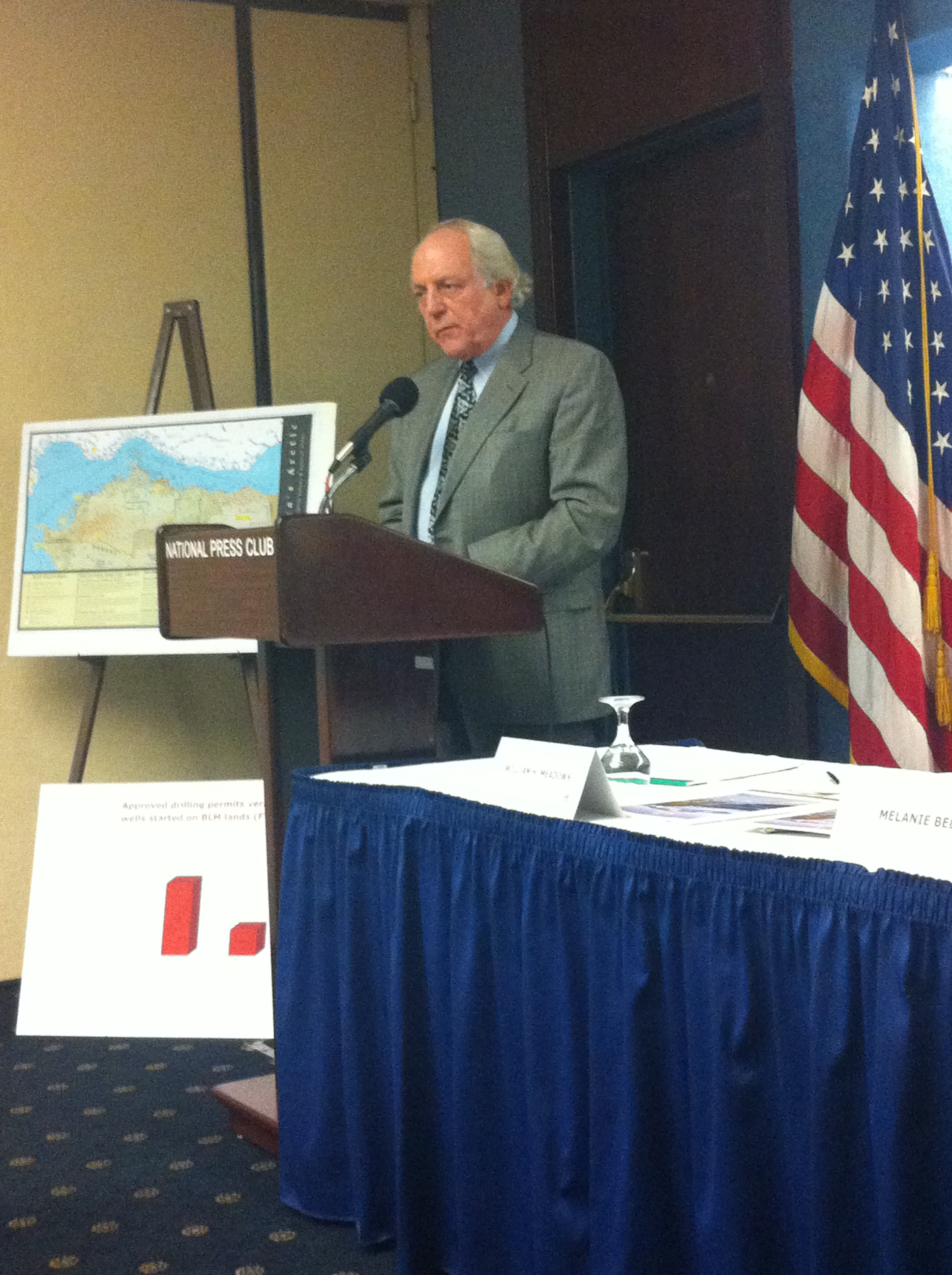
William H. Meadows, president of The Wilderness Society, speaks at a National Press Club event on the future of America's public lands, 2011

=== Automobiles ===
The development of the automobile allowed an abundance of the American population to travel to barren locations of nature. Modern appreciation of nature has turned into an interaction with consumerism rather than visiting raw, untouched patches of nature. With the development of automobiles came the building of roads and recreational development. The Wilderness society advocated against the construction taking place in rural areas of nature. They wanted nature to be preserved and untouched for its natural beauty and the creatures that inhabit it.

=== Expanding protections for public wildlands ===
The Wilderness Society mobilizes public support for legislation that protects public lands through protective wildlands designations. This includes adding new wilderness areas and national monuments into U.S. public lands systems.

==== Wilderness designation ====
The Wilderness Society supports legislation that protects unspoiled public lands as designated "Wilderness". A wilderness designation is the highest form of protection the government can give to any public land. Under The Wilderness Act, designated wilderness areas are protected, permanently, from new development, commercial activities, and motorized vehicles.

As of 2016, the wilderness system contained more than 109 million acres of protected wilderness lands. This system includes more than 750 wilderness areas in all 50 states. The Wilderness Society says it has played a part in most additions to the National Wilderness Preservation System. Recent wilderness additions include:

- Boulder White Clouds Wilderness, Idaho (2015)
- Hermosa Creek Wilderness, Colorado (2014)
- Columbine–Hondo Wilderness, New Mexico (2014)
- Alpine Lakes Wilderness expansions, Washington (2014)
- Wovoka Wilderness, Nevada (2014)

==== National monuments designation ====
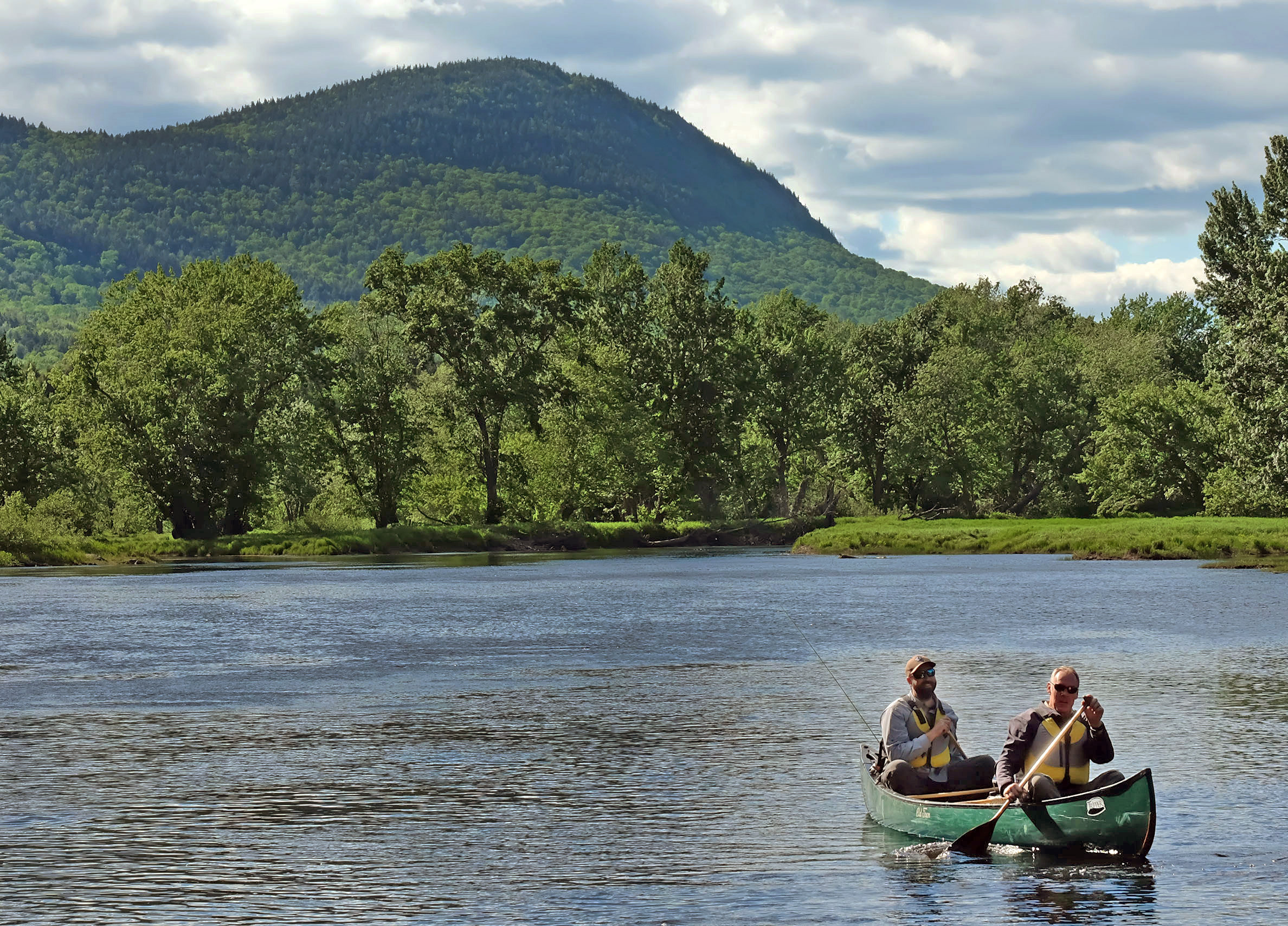
People enjoying the Katahdin Woods and Waters

The Wilderness Society works with local communities to advance efforts that protect unique historical sites, cultural areas and wildlands as national monuments. In recent years, the organization supported numerous monument designations under President Barack Obama, including:

- Katahdin Woods and Waters National Monument, Maine (2016)
- Mojave Trails, Sand to Snow and Castle Mountains national monuments, California (2016)
- Browns Canyon National Monument, Colorado (2015)
- Berryessa Snow Mountain National Monument, California (2015)
- Basin and Range National Monument, Nevada (2015)
- San Gabriel Mountains National Monument, California (2014)
- California Coastal National Monument (expansion), California (2014)
- Rio Grande del Norte National Monument, New Mexico (2013)
- San Juan Islands, Washington (2013)

Recently, the organization has come to the defense of the Antiquities Act, which has come under attack by factions in Congress. The Antiquities Act is the mechanism by which the president of the United States can designate new national monuments.

=== Views on logging and mining ===
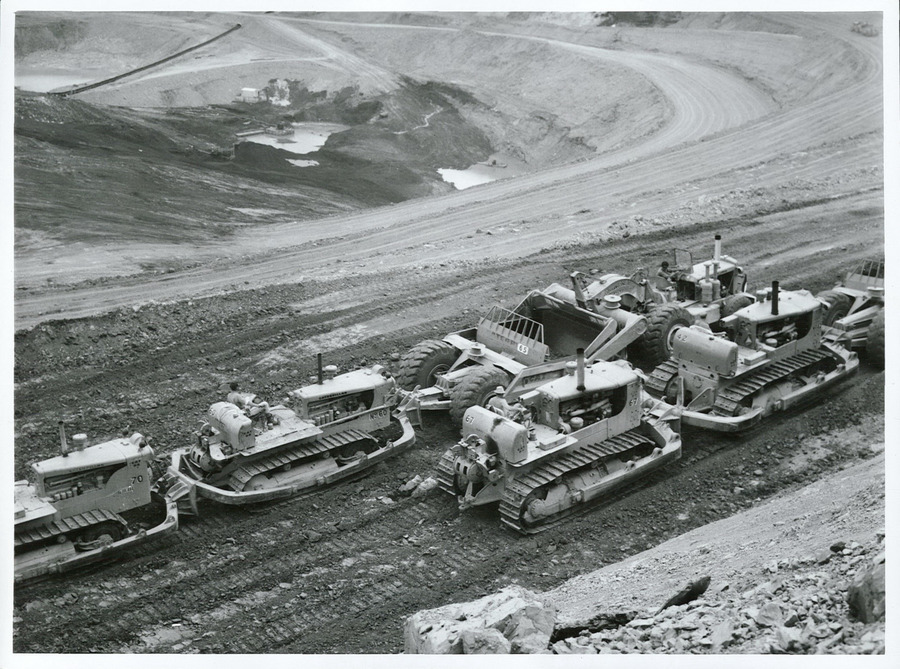
Coal mine in California

The Wilderness Society has throughout its history sought to reduce logging and mining on public lands.

=== Views on geothermal energy ===
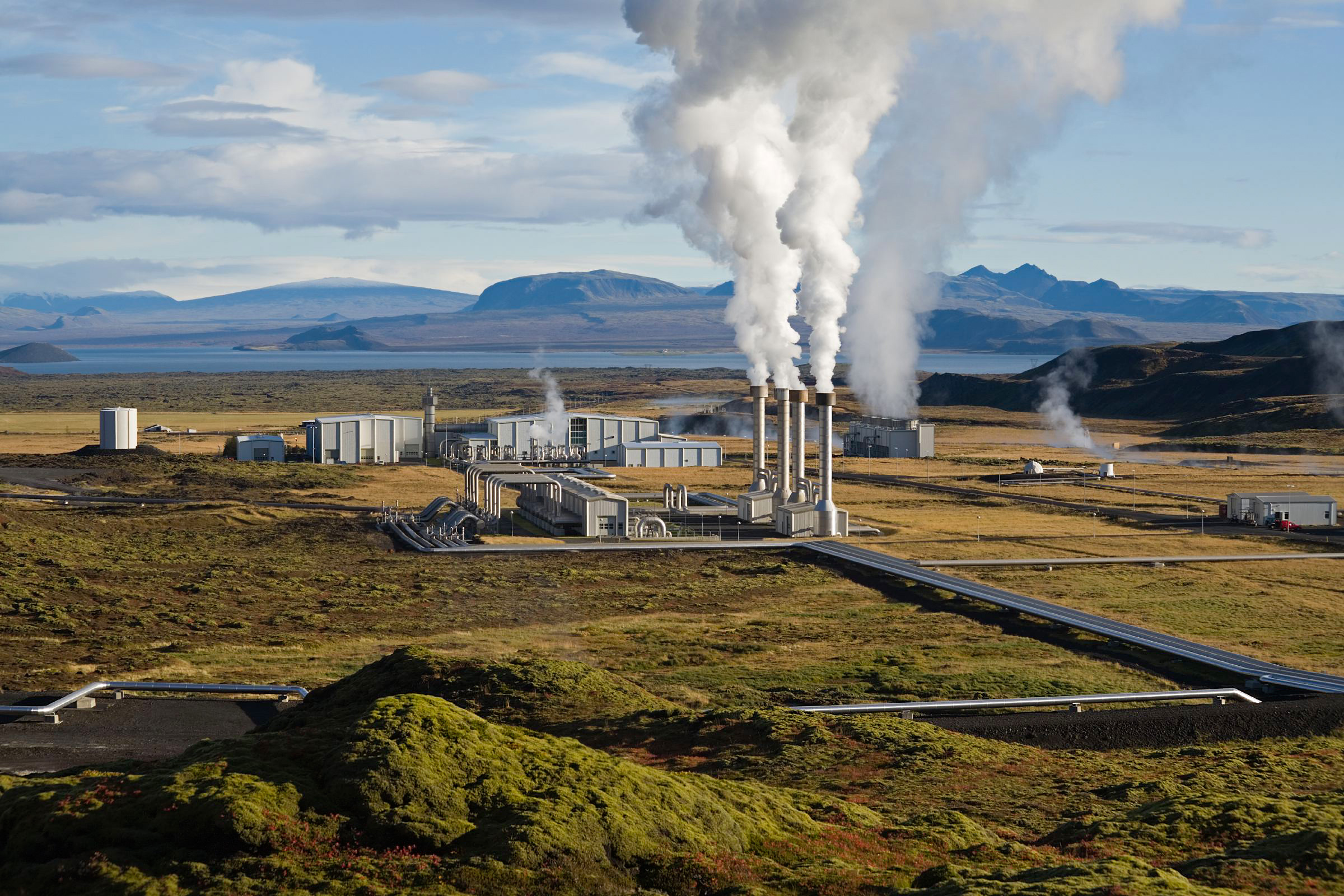
Geothermal power plant in Nesjavellir, Iceland

The Wilderness Society has supported a shift towards greater geothermal energy but has criticized specific geothermal energy projects, arguing that the energy generation risks the quality of air and water, as well as access to public lands.

=== Public land production ===
The Wilderness Society has worked with the United States Forest Service (USFS) to come up with goals on the issue of public land production:

"1. To obtain as much wilderness value as possible relative to the cost and value of the foregone opportunities to produce other goods and services for society.

2. To disperse the future wilderness system as widely as possible over the United States.

3. To represent as many ecosystems as possible so that the scientific and educational purposes of wilderness preservation are best served.

4. To obtain the most wilderness value with the least relative impact on the nation's wood production output.

5. To locate some new wilderness areas closer to densely populated areas so that more people can directly enjoy their benefits."

These goals demonstrate the progress that has been made in just over half a century of The Wilderness Society. In 1964, there were 9 million acres of federal wild land, but now The Wilderness Society has much more extensive wilderness areas, demonstrating its success over the years.

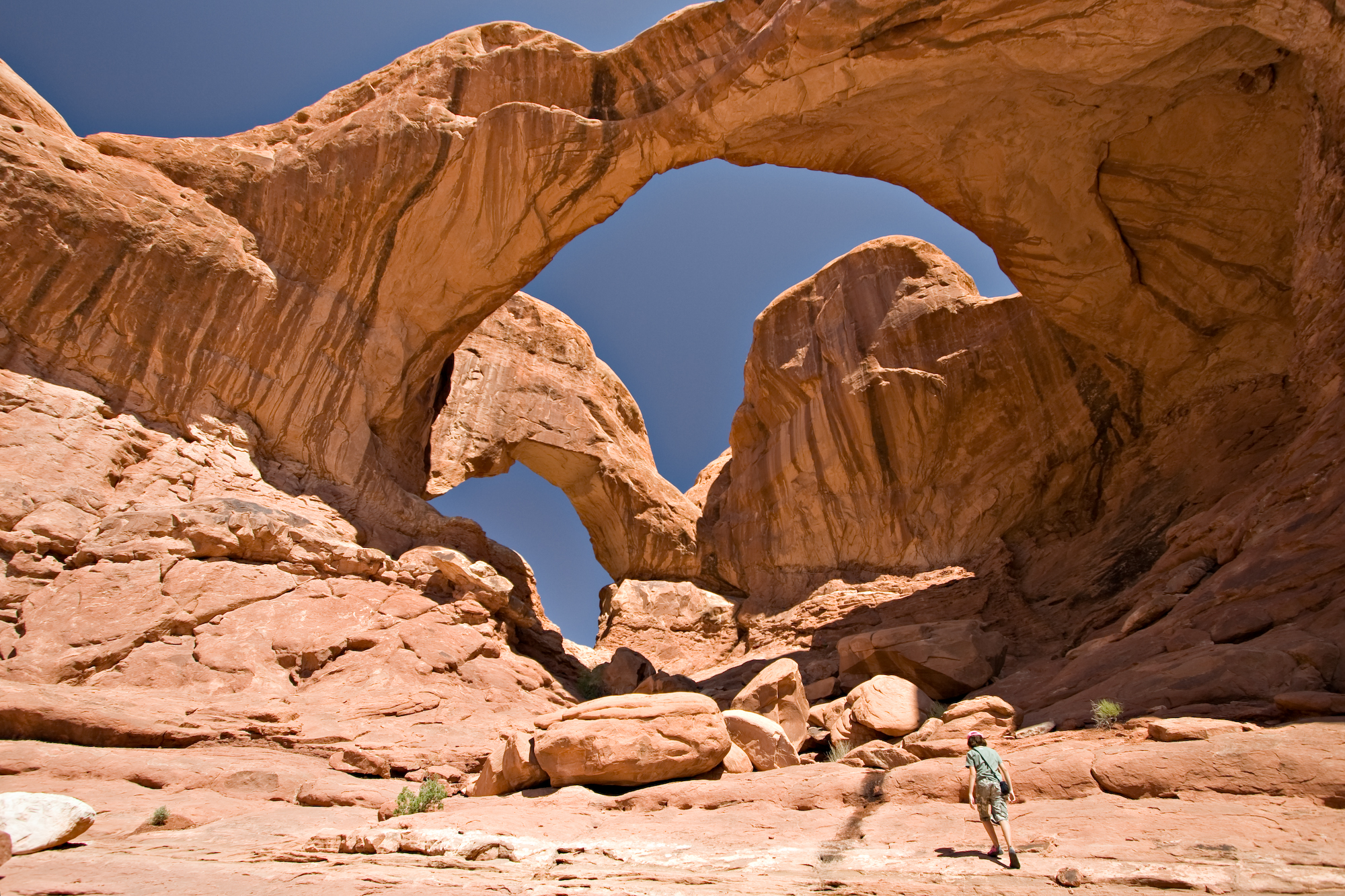
Arches National Park

== Awards ==
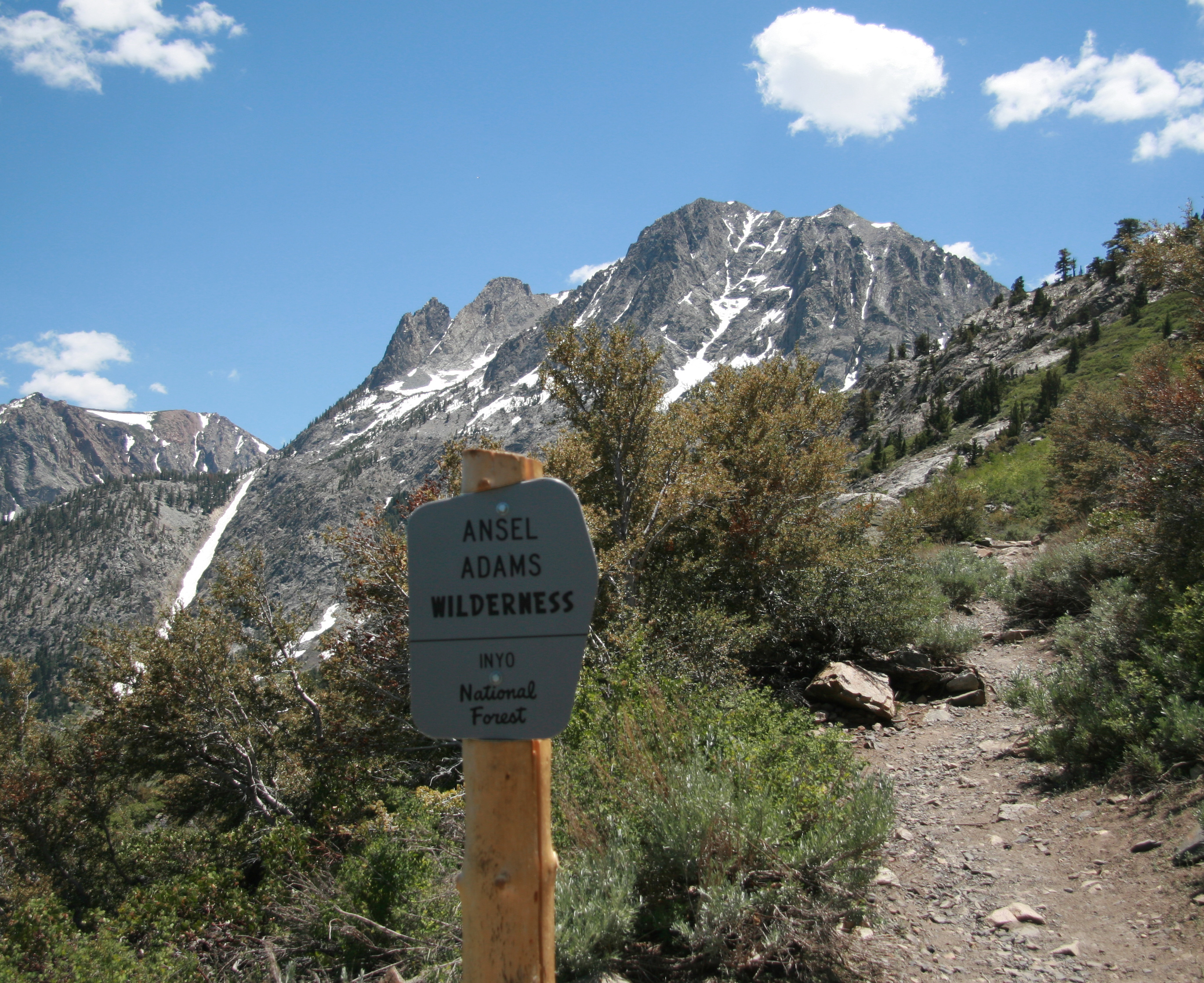
Ansel Adams Wilderness sign on the Rush Creek Trail

The Wilderness Society makes several annual awards.

=== The Ansel Adams Award ===
Named for photographer and conservationist Ansel Adams, the Ansel Adams Award awarded to a current or former federal official who has been a strong advocate of conservation.

Renowned landscape photographer Ansel Adams was deeply involved with The Wilderness Society. Before his death in 1984, Adams selected 75 images as a gift to the organization. The national headquarters building in Washington, D.C., houses the Ansel Adams Collection of the original, signed Ansel Adams photographs. The collection was open to the public at 1615 M St., NW. Since the organization has moved, the gallery is now permanently closed.

=== The Robert Marshall Award ===
The Society's most prestigious award is named in honor its principal founder, Robert Marshall. It is given to private individuals who have had notable influence upon conservation. It was first awarded in 1981 to Sigurd F. Olson, who wrote about conservation and influenced decision makers and the public.

Notable Robert Marshall Award recipients:

- Wallace Stegner, 1989
- Celia Hunter, 1998
- Terry Tempest Williams, 2006
- Bethine Church, 2009
- William Cronon, 2014
- Elizabeth Cushman Titus Putnam, 2016

== See also ==
- Environmental history of the United States
- Sierra Club
