= Bristol Cliffs Wilderness =

Protected area in Vermont, United States

- IUCN category Ib (wilderness area)
- Location within Vermont Location within the United States
- Location: Addison County, Vermont, US
- Nearest city: Lincoln, Vermont
- Coordinates: 44°06′N 73°03′W
- Area: 3,750 acres (1,520 ha)
- Established: 1975
- Governing body: United States Forest Service

The Bristol Cliffs Wilderness is one of eight wilderness areas in the Green Mountain National Forest in the U.S. state of Vermont. The area, near Lincoln, Vermont, is managed by the U.S. Forest Service. With a total of 3,750 acres (1,520 ha), the wilderness is the smallest in Vermont. It was created by the Eastern Wilderness Areas Act of 1975, which makes it one of the oldest wilderness areas in the state.

The Eastern Wilderness Areas Act set aside 6,500 acres (2,600 ha) for Bristol Cliffs Wilderness, including 2,725 acres (1,103 ha) of private property claimed to have been improperly seized by eminent domain. On September 28–29, 1975, a subcommittee of the U.S. Senate held a public hearing in Bristol, Vermont to receive testimony on a bill intended to rectify the situation. The bill later passed Congress and was signed into law on April 16, 1976. The bill reduced the area of the Bristol Cliffs Wilderness to 3,775 acres (1,528 ha), in effect returning the disputed land to the local landowners. This marked the first (and only) time in U.S. history that a wilderness area was subsequently reduced in size.

== See also ==
- List of largest wilderness areas in the United States
- List of wilderness areas of the United States
- National Wilderness Preservation System
- Wilderness Act
