= Ansel Adams Award (The Wilderness Society) =

- Description: Honoring federal officials for fervent advocacy of conservation
- Country: United States
- Presented by: The Wilderness Society
- Website: www.wilderness.org

The Ansel Adams Award is an annual award given by The Wilderness Society of the United States. Named by American photographer and environmentalist Ansel Adams, the award is given to a current or former federal official who has been a fervent advocate of conservation.

== Recipients ==
- 2024 Edward Markey
- 2023 Nancy Pelosi
- 2022 Raúl Grijalva
- 2019 Jerry Brown
- 2016 Dianne Feinstein
- 2015 John Podesta
- 2014 Max Baucus
- 2013 Ken Salazar
- 2012 Not awarded
- 2011 Bruce Babbitt
- 2010 Mike Dombeck (US Forest Service)
- 2009 Jeff Bingaman
- 2008 Norman D. Dicks
- 2007 James M. Jeffords; Sherwood L. Boehlert
- 2006 Maria Cantwell
- 2005 Ernest F. Hollings
- 2004 Nick J. Rahall II; Harry Reid
- 2002 John Kerry and Joseph Lieberman
- 2001 John Lewis
- 2000 David Obey and John Porter
- 1999 Kathleen A. McGinty
- 1998 Dale Bumpers
- 1997 Albert Gore Jr.
- 1994 Bruce F. Vento
- 1993 Not awarded
- 1991 George Miller
- 1990 Gaylord Nelson
- 1989 William V. Roth Jr.; Allan Cranston
- 1988 John H. Chafee
- 1987 Sidney Yates
- 1986 Stewart L. Udall
- 1985 Cecil D. Andrus
- 1984 Morris K. Udall
- 1983 Phillip Burton
- 1982 John F. Seiberling
- 1981 Jimmy Carter
- 1980 Ansel Adams

== See also ==
- List of environmental awards
- List of prizes named after people
