= Copeland Report =

The Copeland Report was the result of a United States Congressional investigation of forestry for the purpose of outlining a coordinated plan that would "insure all of the economic and social benefits which can and should be derived from productive forests by fully utilizing the forest land." The investigation was called for by Senator Royal S. Copeland of New York in Senate Resolution 175 (72d Congress, 1st sess., 1932) Earle Clapp, later Chief Forester of the US Forest Service, supervised the report.

The report was finished in April 1933 and was a two-volume, 1,677-page document titled A National Plan for American Forestry which described and evaluated all aspects of forestry from timber, water, range and wildlife to recreation, state aid and fire protection. This report became the blueprint for forestry in President Franklin D. Roosevelt's New Deal and had its beginnings in a senatorial discussion of unemployment, where reforestation might be a source for jobs. Previous reports had given the state of the forests, but without offering a plan for improvement.

In the Copeland Report the main recommendations were: (1) A large extension of public ownership of forest lands, and (2) more intensive management on all forest lands.
