= Ernest Oberholtzer =

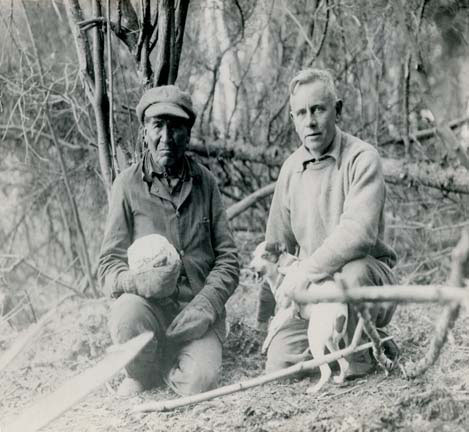
Oberholtzer (right) with dog Skippy and Ojibwe trapper and guide Billy Maggie

Ernest Carl Oberholtzer (February 6, 1884 – June 6, 1977) was an American explorer, author, and conservationist.

== Life and career ==
Nicknamed "Ober", he was born and raised in Davenport, Iowa, but he lived most of his adult life in Minnesota. Oberholtzer attended Harvard University and received a bachelor of arts degree, but left after one year of graduate study in landscape architecture. He made his first trip to the Minnesota-Ontario border lakes in 1906.

In 1909 he took his first extended canoe voyage through the border lakes and the Rainy Lake watershed, traveling 3,000 miles that summer. During the period from 1908 to 1915, Oberholtzer wrote a number of articles and short stories, some under the penname Ernest Carliowa. Many of the stories and articles were based on his canoe trip experiences. In 1913, Oberholtzer moved to Rainy Lake. He purchased Mallard Island in 1922; the tiny island would be his home for more than 50 years.

After plans were announced by business mogul Edward Backus to construct a series of dams to harness the Rainy Lake watershed for power generation, Oberholtzer spoke in opposition at a hearing of the International Joint Commission held at International Falls in September 1925. As a result of meetings with Minneapolis businessmen who were similarly opposed to industrialization of the area, the Quetico-Superior Council was formed in 1928. Oberholtzer served as its first president. His activities for the council included lobbying United States Congress and the Minnesota legislature, testifying before the International Joint Commission and building public support for the council's program. In 1934, President Franklin D. Roosevelt created the President's Quetico-Superior Committee to advise and coordinate government activity concerning the Quetico-Superior area. Oberholtzer was its first chairman, and served as a member until 1968.

Oberholtzer was one of the eight founding members of The Wilderness Society and served on its executive council from 1937 until 1967. His addition to The Wilderness Society lent national stature to the group. In addition to his wilderness campaigning, he spoke fluent Ojibwe and was a fervent student of their culture. He never married and died in 1977 after a long period of ill health.

Oberholtzer is recognized today as a leading advocate for the preservation of the Quetico-Superior lake area, as well as an advocate of the Native American culture in that region. The Minneapolis Star Tribune selected Oberholtzer as one of the 100 Most Influential Minnesotans of the 20th century.

== Exhibition ==
An exhibit of Oberholtzer's photographs was held at the Mabee-Gerrer Museum of Art. The exhibit included images displaying his relationship with the Ojibwe and their lifestyle. One section of the exhibition detailed in photograph the process of harvesting and preparing wild rice. Traditions: Ernest Oberholtzer's Photographs of the Rainy Lake Ojibwa ran from May 4 to June 30, 2013.

== Notes ==
=== References ===
- Paddock, Joe. 2001. Keeper of the Wild: The Life of Ernest Oberholtzer. Minnesota Historical Society Press. ISBN 0-87351-409-2.
- Sutter, Paul. 2002. Driven Wild: How the Fight against Automobiles Launched the Modern Wilderness Movement. Seattle: University of Washington press. ISBN 0-295-98219-5.
