= Bernard Frank (wilderness activist) =

American forester and wilderness activist (1902–1964)

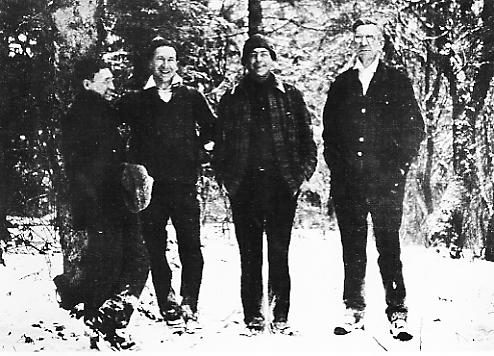
Four founders of The Wilderness Society: (l-r) Bernard Frank, Harvey Broome, Bob Marshall, and Benton MacKaye

Bernard Frank (March 7, 1902 – November 15, 1964) was an American forester and wilderness activist. He is known for being one of the eight founding members of The Wilderness Society.

Frank was born in New York City. He studied at Cornell University, receiving his bachelor's and master's degrees. In 1927, he joined the United States Forest Service in the United States Department of Agriculture. He worked for the Forest Service for more than 30 years, usually in positions in the Forest Service headquarters in Washington, D.C., He often worked with other agencies like the Tennessee Valley Authority or committees of Congress on matters related to forestry and water.

In 1960, he became a professor of watershed management at Colorado State University in Fort Collins.

Aside from being a long-time member of The Wilderness Society, he was active in many other conservation-oriented organizations including the Society of American Foresters, the Soil Conservation Society of America, the National Audubon Society, and the Colorado Mountain Club. He was a leader in organizing the Rock Creek Watershed Association which worked to restore and preserve the area around Rock Creek in Washington, D.C., and Maryland. He participated with Justice William O. Douglas in the effort that lead to the creation of the Chesapeake and Ohio Canal National Historical Park. He was honored for his work in this region with the naming of Lake Bernard Frank in Derwood, Maryland.

Franks wrote numerous articles and two books, including 1950's Water, Land, and People and 1955's Our National Forests.
