= Harry Brower Sr. =

Iñupiaq whaling captain and community leader

Harry Brower, Sr. (1924–1992) or Kupaaq was an Iñupiaq whaling captain and community leader from Utqiagvik, Alaska.

Harry Brower was the youngest son of whaling captain Charles D. Brower and Asianggataq Brower (Aluiqsi). Brower worked for 27 years at the Naval Arctic Research Laboratory as a carpenter and field researcher alongside Max C. Brewer, John F. Schindler, Kenneth Utuayuk Toovak, and Thomas F. Albert.

His son, Harry K. Brower, Jr. has been mayor of Utqiagvik since 2016. As of 2001 he was Subsistence Research Coordinator with the North Slope Borough’s Department of Wildlife Management.
