= Trans-Alaska Pipeline System =

Alaskan oil pipeline system

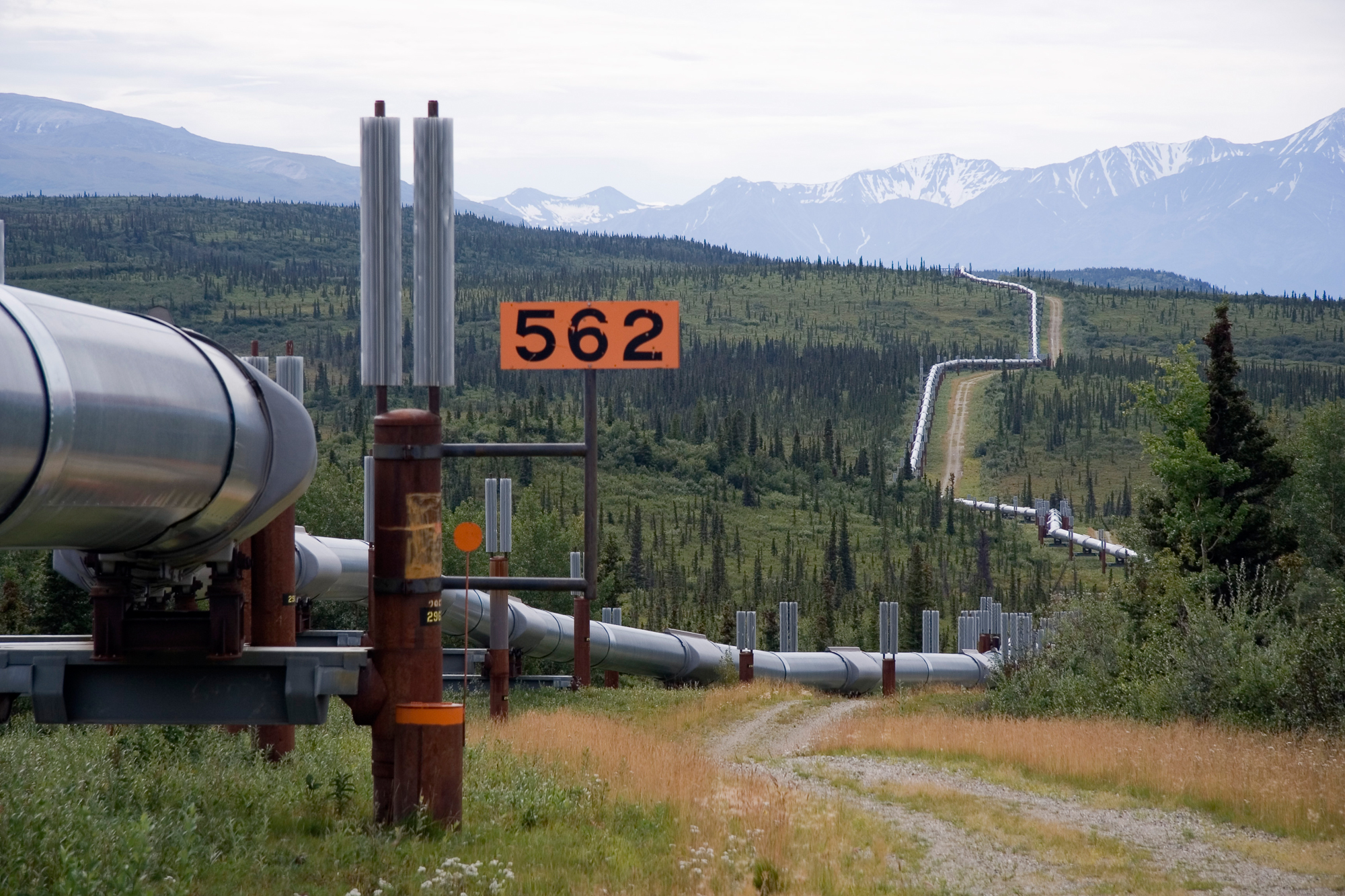
- The trans-Alaska oil pipeline

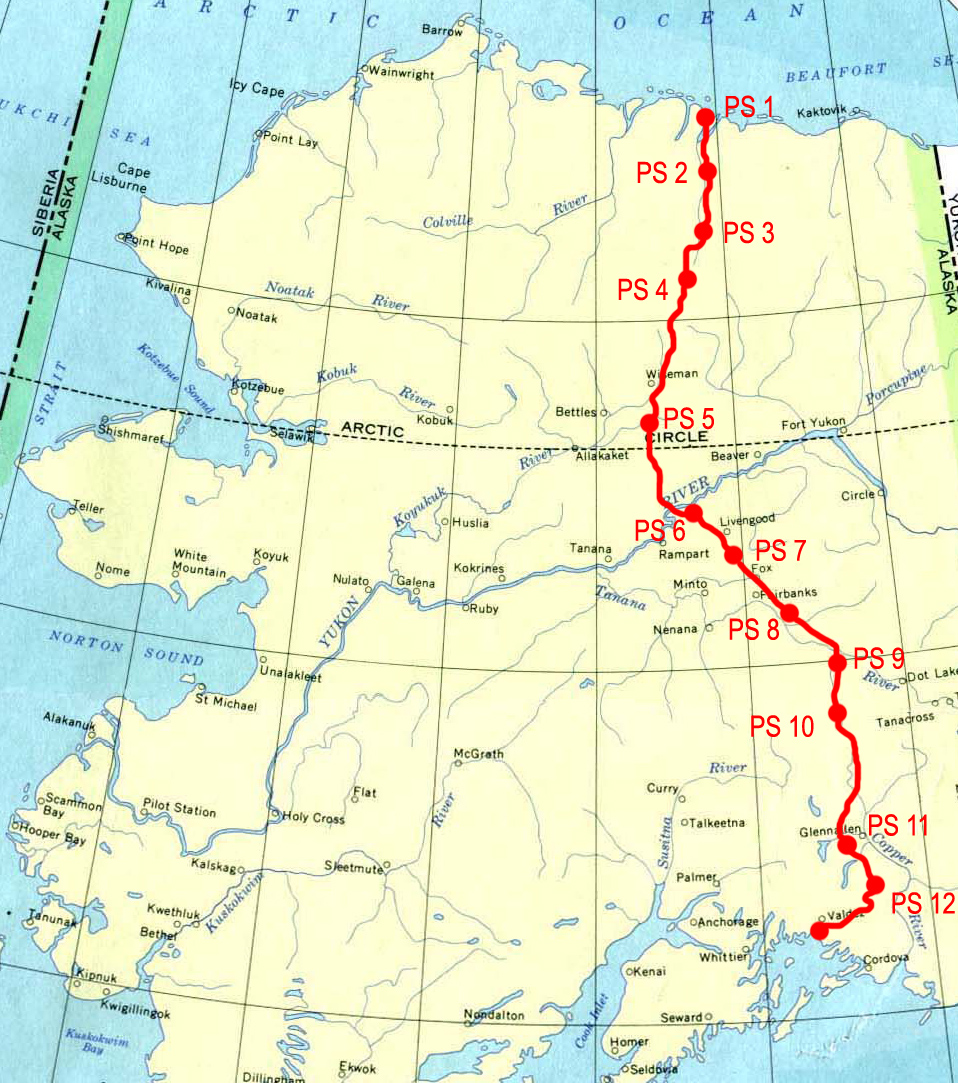
- Location of trans-Alaska pipeline

Location
- Country: United States
- Coordinates: 70°15′26″N 148°37′8″W
- Direction: North–South
- Start: Prudhoe Bay
- Passes through: Deadhorse; Delta Junction; Fairbanks; Fox; Glennallen; North Pole
- To: Valdez
- Runs alongside: Dalton Highway; Richardson Highway; Elliott Highway

General information
- Type: Pump stations
- Owner: Alyeska Pipeline Service Company
- Partners: BP (1970–2020); ConocoPhillips (1970–present); ExxonMobil (1970–present); Hilcorp (2020–present); Koch Industries (2003–2012); Unocal (1970–2019); Williams Companies (2000–2003)
- Commissioned: 1977; 49 years ago

Technical information
- Length: 800.3 mi (1,288.0 km)
- Maximum discharge: 2.136 million bbl/d (339,600 m^{3}/d)
- Diameter: 48 in (1,219 mm)
- No. of pumping stations: 12

The Trans-Alaska Pipeline System (TAPS) is an oil transportation system spanning Alaska, including the trans-Alaska crude-oil pipeline, 12 pump stations, several hundred miles of feeder pipelines, and the Valdez Marine Terminal. TAPS is one of the world's largest pipeline systems. The core pipeline itself, which is commonly called the Alaska pipeline, trans-Alaska pipeline, or Alyeska pipeline, (or the pipeline as referred to by Alaskan residents), is an 800-mile (1,300 km) long, 48-inch (1.22 m) diameter pipeline that conveys oil from Prudhoe Bay, on Alaska's North Slope, south to Valdez, on the shores of Prince William Sound in southcentral Alaska. The crude oil pipeline is privately owned by the Alyeska Pipeline Service Company.

Oil was first discovered in Prudhoe Bay in 1968 and the 800 miles of 48" steel pipe was ordered from Japan in 1969 (U.S. steel manufacturers did not have the capacity at that time). However, construction was delayed for nearly 5 years due to legal and environmental issues. The eight oil companies that owned the rights to the oil hired Bechtel for the pipeline design and construction and Fluor for the 12 pump stations and the Valdez Terminal. Preconstruction work during 1973 and 1974 was critical and included the building of camps to house workers, construction of roads and bridges where none existed, and carefully laying out the pipeline right of way to avoid difficult river crossings and animal habitats. Construction of the pipeline system took place between 1975 and 1977. It was important for the United States to have a domestic source of oil to offset the high rise in foreign oil and the Alaska Pipeline fulfilled that obligation.

Building oil pipelines in the 1950s and 60s was not difficult in the contiguous United States. However, in building the Alaska Pipeline, engineers faced a wide range of difficulties, stemming mainly from the extreme cold and the difficult, isolated terrain. The construction of the pipeline was one of the first large-scale projects to deal with problems caused by permafrost, and special construction techniques had to be developed to cope with the frozen ground. The project attracted tens of thousands of workers to Alaska due to high wages, long work hours, and paid-for housing, causing a boomtown atmosphere in Valdez, Fairbanks, and Anchorage.

The first barrel of oil traveled through the pipeline in the summer of 1977, with full-scale production by the end of the year. Several notable incidents of oil leakage have occurred since, including those caused by sabotage, maintenance failures, and bullet holes. As of 2026, it had shipped over 19 billion barrels of oil. The pipeline has been shown capable of delivering over 2 million barrels of oil per day but currently operates at a fraction of maximum capacity, around 470,000 barrels per day. If flow were to stop or throughput were too little, the line could freeze. The pipeline could be extended and used to transport oil produced from controversial proposed drilling projects in the nearby Arctic National Wildlife Refuge (ANWR).

== Origins ==
Iñupiat people on the North Slope of Alaska had mined oil-saturated peat for possibly thousands of years, using it as fuel for heat and light. Whalers who stayed at Point Barrow saw the substance the Iñupiat called pitch and recognized it as petroleum. Charles Brower, a whaler who settled at Barrow and operated trading posts along the Arctic coast, directed geologist Alfred Hulse Brooks to oil seepages at Cape Simpson and Fish Creek in the far north of Alaska, east of the village of Barrow. Brooks' report confirmed the observations of Thomas Simpson, an officer of the Hudson's Bay Company who first observed the seepages in 1836. Similar seepages were found at the Canning River in 1919 by Ernest de Koven Leffingwell. Following the First World War, as the United States Navy converted its ships from coal to fuel oil, a stable supply of oil became important to the U.S. government. Accordingly, President Warren G. Harding established by executive order a series of Naval Petroleum Reserves (NPR-1 through -4) across the United States. These reserves were areas thought to be rich in oil and set aside for future drilling by the U.S. Navy. Naval Petroleum Reserve No. 4 was sited in Alaska's far north, just south of Barrow, and encompassed 23,000,000 acres (93,078 km^{2}).

The first explorations of NPR-4 were undertaken by the U.S. Geological Survey from 1923 to 1925 and focused on mapping, identifying and characterizing coal resources in the western portion of the reserve and petroleum exploration in the eastern and northern portions of the reserve. These surveys were primarily pedestrian in nature; no drilling or remote sensing techniques were available at the time. These surveys named many of the geographic features of the areas explored, including the Philip Smith Mountains and quadrangle.

The petroleum reserve lay dormant until World War II provided an impetus to explore new oil prospects. The first renewed efforts to identify strategic oil assets were a two pronged survey using bush aircraft, local Inupiat guides, and personnel from multiple agencies to locate reported seeps. Ebbley and Joesting reported on these initial forays in 1943. Starting in 1944, the U.S. Navy funded oil exploration near Umiat Mountain, on the Colville River in the foothills of the Brooks Range. Surveyors from the U.S. Geological Survey spread across the petroleum reserve and worked to determine its extent until 1953, when the Navy suspended funding for the project. The USGS found several oil fields, most notably the Alpine and Umiat Oil Field, but none were cost-effective to develop.

Four years after the Navy suspended its survey, Richfield Oil Corporation (later Atlantic Richfield and ARCO) drilled an enormously successful oil well near the Swanson River in southern Alaska, near Kenai. The resulting Swanson River Oil Field was Alaska's first major commercially producing oil field, and it spurred the exploration and development of many others. By 1965, five oil and 11 natural gas fields had been developed. This success and the previous Navy exploration of its petroleum reserve led petroleum engineers to the conclusion that the area of Alaska north of the Brooks Range surely held large amounts of oil and gas. The problems came from the area's remoteness and harsh climate. It was estimated that between 200,000,000 barrels (32,000,000 m^{3}) and 500,000,000 barrels (79,000,000 m^{3}) of oil would have to be recovered to make a North Slope oil field commercially viable.

In 1967, Atlantic Richfield (ARCO) began detailed survey work in the Prudhoe Bay area. By January 1968, reports began circulating that natural gas had been discovered by a discovery well. On March 12, 1968, an Atlantic Richfield drilling crew hit paydirt. A discovery well began flowing at the rate of 1,152 barrels (183.2 m^{3}) of oil per day. On June 25, ARCO announced that a second discovery well likewise was producing oil at a similar rate. Together, the two wells confirmed the existence of the Prudhoe Bay Oil Field. The new field contained more than 25 billion barrels (4.0×10^{9} m^{3}) of oil, making it the largest in North America and the 18th largest in the world.

The problem soon became how to develop the oil field and ship product to U.S. markets. Pipeline systems represent a high initial cost but lower operating costs, but no pipeline of the necessary length had yet been constructed. Several other solutions were offered. Boeing proposed a series of gigantic 12-engine tanker aircraft to transport oil from the field, the Boeing RC-1. General Dynamics proposed a line of tanker submarines for travel beneath the Arctic ice cap, and another group proposed extending the Alaska Railroad to Prudhoe Bay.

To test this, in 1969 Humble Oil and Refining Company sent a specially fitted oil tanker, the SS Manhattan, to test the feasibility of transporting oil via ice-breaking tankers to market. The Manhattan was fitted with an ice-breaking bow, powerful engines, and hardened propellers before successfully traveling the Northwest Passage from the Atlantic Ocean to the Beaufort Sea. During the voyage, the ship suffered damage to several of its cargo holds, which flooded with seawater. Wind-blown ice forced the Manhattan to change its intended route from the M'Clure Strait to the smaller Prince of Wales Strait. It was escorted back through the Northwest Passage by a Canadian Coast Guard icebreaker, the CCGS John A. Macdonald. Although the Manhattan transited the Northwest Passage again in the summer of 1970, the concept was considered too risky.

== Forming Alyeska ==
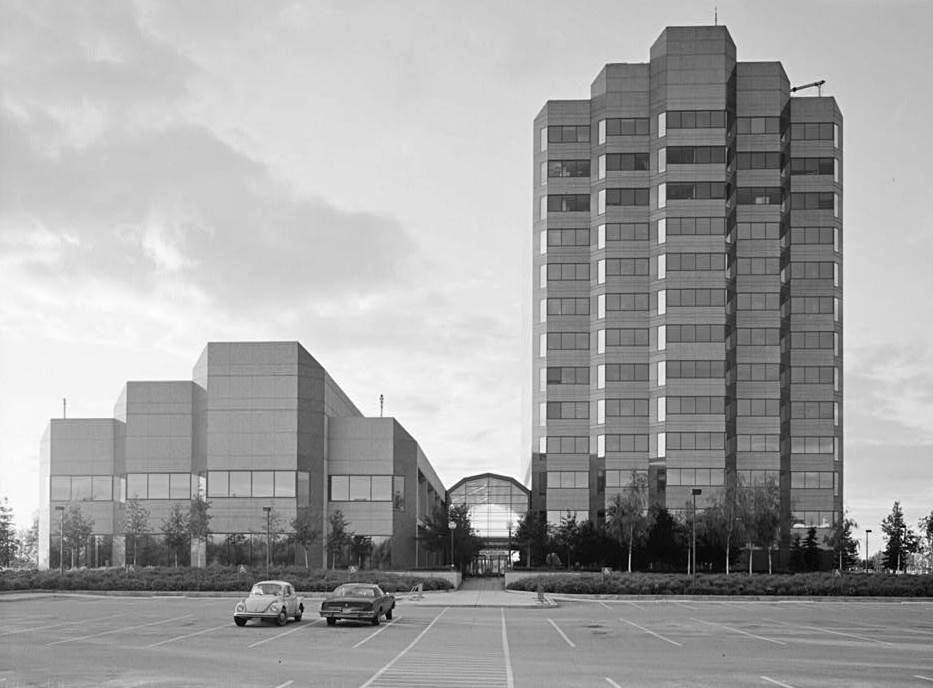
Alaska headquarters of BP in Anchorage

In February 1969, before the SS Manhattan had even sailed from its East Coast starting point, the Trans-Alaska Pipeline System (TAPS), an unincorporated joint group created by ARCO, British Petroleum, and Humble Oil in October 1968, asked for permission from the United States Department of the Interior to begin geological and engineering studies of a proposed oil pipeline route from Prudhoe Bay to Valdez, across Alaska. Even before the first feasibility studies began, the oil companies had chosen the approximate route of the pipeline.

Because TAPS hoped to begin laying pipe by September 1969, substantial orders were placed for steel pipeline 48 inches (122 cm) in diameter. No American company manufactured pipe of that specification, so three Japanese companies—Sumitomo Metal Industries, Nippon Steel Corporation and Nippon Kokan Kabushiki Kaisha—received a $100 million contract for more than 800 miles (1280 km) of pipeline. At the same time, TAPS placed a $30 million order for the first of the enormous pumps that would be needed to push the oil through the pipeline.

In June 1969, as the SS Manhattan traveled through the Northwest Passage, TAPS formally applied to the Interior Department for a permit to build an oil pipeline across 800 miles (1,300 km) of public land—from Prudhoe Bay to Valdez. The application was for a 100-foot (30.5 m) wide right of way to build a subterranean 48-inch (122-centimeter) pipeline including 11 pumping stations. Another right of way was requested to build a construction and maintenance highway paralleling the pipeline. A document of just 20 pages contained all of the information TAPS had collected about the route up to that stage in its surveying.

The Interior Department responded by sending personnel to analyze the proposed route and plan. Max Brewer, an arctic expert in charge of the Naval Arctic Research Laboratory at Barrow, concluded that the plan to bury most of the pipeline was completely unfeasible because of the abundance of permafrost along the route. In a report, Brewer said the hot oil conveyed by the pipeline would melt the underlying permafrost, causing the pipeline to fail as its support turned to mud. This report was passed along to the appropriate committees of the U.S. House and Senate, which had to approve the right-of-way proposal because it asked for more land than authorized in the Mineral Leasing Act of 1920 and because it would break a development freeze imposed in 1966 by former Secretary of the Interior Stewart Udall.

Udall imposed the freeze on any projects involving land claimed by Alaska Natives in hopes that an overarching Native claims settlement would result. In the fall of 1969, the Department of the Interior and TAPS set about bypassing the land freeze by obtaining waivers from the various native villages that had claims to a portion of the proposed right of way. By the end of September, all the relevant villages had waived their right-of-way claims, and Secretary of the Interior Wally Hickel asked Congress to lift the land freeze for the entire TAPS project. After several months of questioning by the House and Senate committees with oversight of the project, Hickel was given the authority to lift the land freeze and give the go-ahead to TAPS.

TAPS began issuing letters of intent to contractors for construction of the "haul road", a highway running the length of the pipeline route to be used for construction. Heavy equipment was prepared, and crews prepared to go to work after Hickel gave permission and the snow melted. Before Hickel could act, however, several Alaska Native and conservation groups asked a judge in Washington, D.C., to issue an injunction against the project. Several of the native villages that had waived claims on the right of way reneged because TAPS had not chosen any Native contractors for the project and the contractors chosen were not likely to hire Native workers.

On April 1, 1970, Judge George Luzerne Hart, Jr., of the United States District Court for the District of Columbia, ordered the Interior Department to not issue a construction permit for a section of the project that crossed one of the claims. Less than two weeks later, Hart heard arguments from conservation groups that the TAPS project violated the Mineral Leasing Act and the National Environmental Policy Act, which had gone into effect at the start of the year. Hart issued an injunction against the project, preventing the Interior Department from issuing a construction permit and halting the project in its tracks.

After the Department of the Interior was stopped from issuing a construction permit, the unincorporated TAPS consortium was reorganized into the new incorporated Alyeska Pipeline Service Company. Former Humble Oil manager Edward L. Patton was put in charge of the new company and began to lobby strongly in favor of an Alaska Native claims settlement to resolve the disputes over the pipeline right of way.

== Opposition ==
Opposition to construction of the pipeline primarily came from two sources: Alaska Native groups and conservationists. Alaska Natives were upset that the pipeline would cross the land traditionally claimed by a variety of native groups, but no economic benefits would accrue to them directly. Conservationists were angry at what they saw as an incursion into America's last wilderness.

=== Conservation objections ===
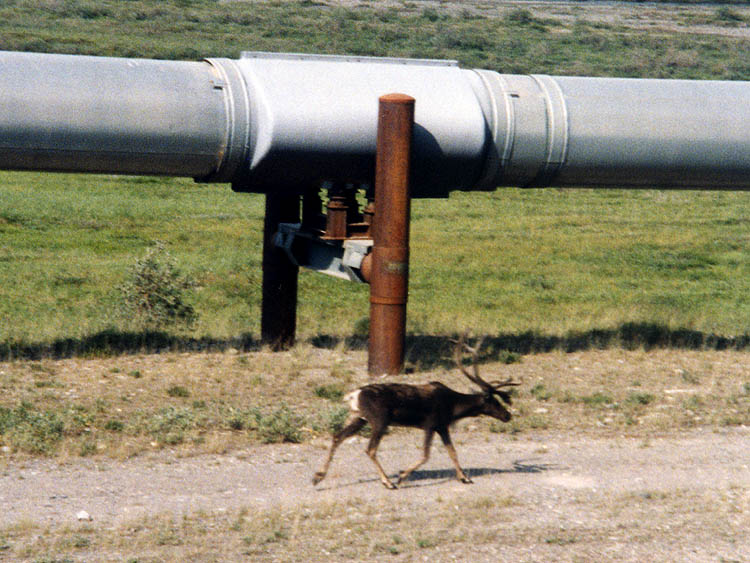
A caribou walks next to a section of the pipeline north of the Brooks Range. Opponents of the pipeline asserted the presence of the pipeline would interfere with the caribou.

Although conservation groups and environmental organizations had voiced opposition to the pipeline project before 1970, the introduction of the National Environmental Policy Act allowed them legal grounds to halt the project. Arctic engineers had raised concerns about the way plans for a subterranean pipeline showed ignorance of Arctic engineering and permafrost in particular. A clause in NEPA requiring a study of alternatives and another clause requiring an environmental impact statement turned those concerns into tools used by the Wilderness Society, Friends of the Earth, and the Environmental Defense Fund in their Spring 1970 lawsuit to stop the project.

The injunction against the project forced Alyeska to do further research throughout the summer of 1970. The collected material was turned over to the Interior Department in October 1970, and a draft environmental impact statement was published in January 1971. The 294-page statement drew massive criticism, generating more than 12,000 pages of testimony and evidence in Congressional debates by the end of March. Criticisms of the project included its effect on the Alaska tundra, possible pollution, harm to animals, geographic features, and the lack of much engineering information from Alyeska. One element of opposition the report quelled was the discussion of alternatives. All the proposed alternatives—extension of the Alaska Railroad, an alternative route through Canada, establishing a port at Prudhoe Bay, and more—were deemed to pose more environmental risks than construction of a pipeline directly across Alaska.

Opposition also was directed at the building of the construction and maintenance highway parallel to the pipeline. Although a clause in Alyeska's pipeline proposal called for removal of the pipeline at a certain point, no such provision was made for removal of the road. Sydney Howe, president of the Conservation Foundation, warned: "The oil might last for fifty years. A road would remain forever." This argument relied upon the slow growth of plants and animals in far northern Alaska due to the harsh conditions and short growing season. In testimony, an environmentalist argued that arctic trees, though only a few feet tall, had been seedlings "when George Washington was inaugurated".

The portion of the environmental debate with the biggest symbolic impact took place when discussing the pipeline's impact on caribou herds. Environmentalists proposed that the pipeline would have an effect on caribou similar to the effect of the U.S. transcontinental railroad on the American bison population of North America. Pipeline critics said the pipeline would block traditional migration routes, making caribou populations smaller and making them easier to hunt. This idea was exploited in anti-pipeline advertising, most notably when a picture of a forklift carrying several legally shot caribou was emblazoned with the slogan, "There is more than one way to get caribou across the Alaska Pipeline". The use of caribou as an example of the pipeline's environmental effects reached a peak in the spring of 1971, when the draft environmental statement was being debated.

=== Native objections ===
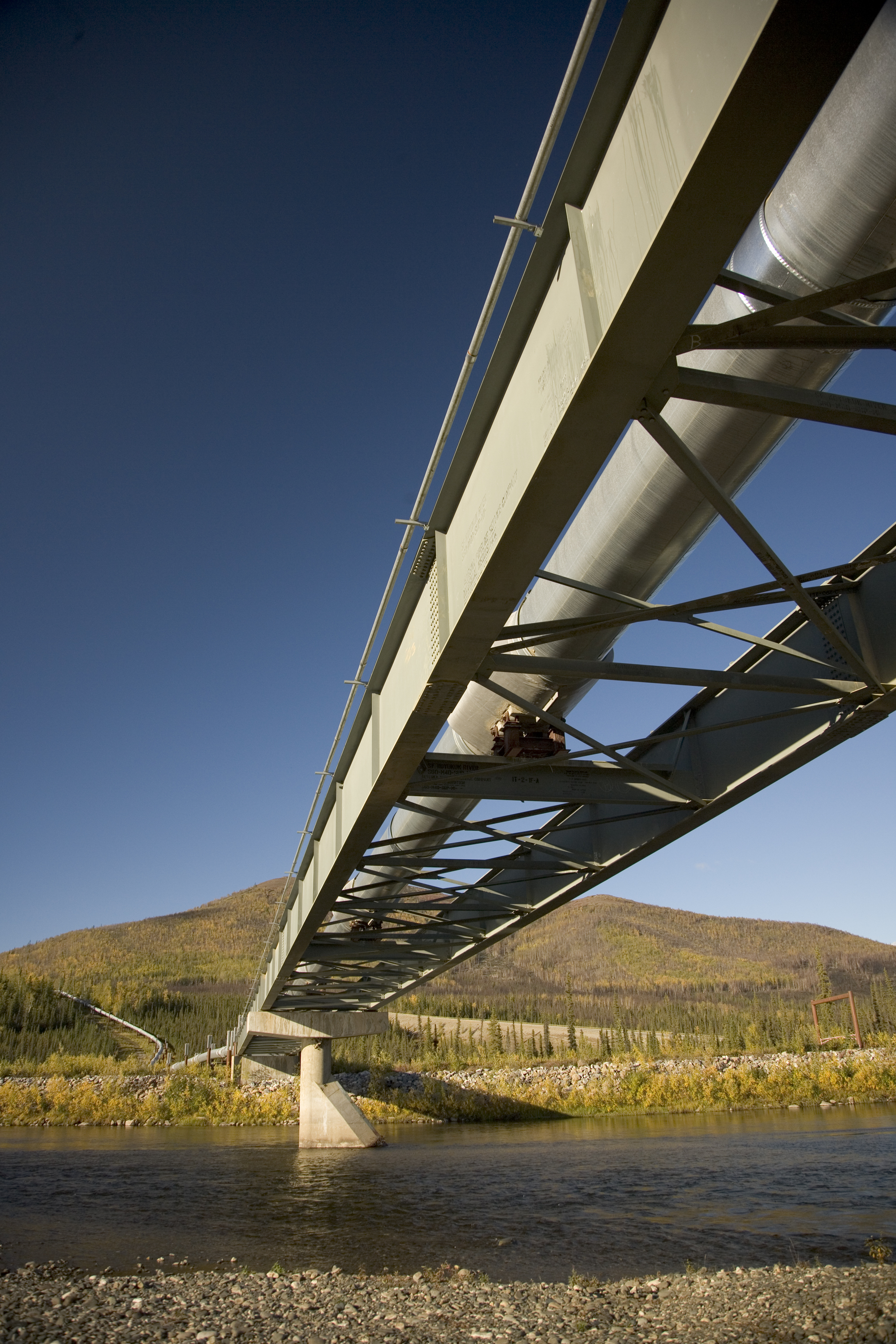
The pipeline passes underneath many smaller rivers and streams, but bridges cover longer crossings.

In 1902, the United States Department of Agriculture set aside 16,000,000 acres (64,750 km^{2}) of Southeast Alaska as the Tongass National Forest. Tlingit natives who lived in the area protested that the land was theirs and had been unfairly taken. In 1935, Congress passed a law allowing the Tlingits to sue for recompense, and the resulting case dragged on until 1968, when a $7.5 million settlement was reached. Following the Native lawsuit to halt work on the Trans-Alaska Pipeline, this precedent was frequently mentioned in debate, causing pressure to resolve the situation more quickly than the 33 years it had taken for the Tlingits to be satisfied. Between 1968 and 1971, a succession of bills were introduced into the U.S. Congress to compensate statewide Native claims. The earliest bill offered $7 million, but this was flatly rejected.

The Alaska Federation of Natives, which had been created in 1966, hired former United States Supreme Court justice Arthur Goldberg, who suggested that a settlement should include 40 million acres (160,000 km^{2}) of land and a payment of $500 million. The issue remained at a standstill until Alyeska began lobbying in favor of a Native claims act in Congress in order to lift the legal injunction against pipeline construction. In October 1971, President Richard Nixon signed the Alaska Native Claims Settlement Act (ANCSA). Under the act, Native groups would renounce their land claims in exchange for $962.5 million and 148.5 million acres (601,000 km^{2}) in federal land. The money and land were split up among village and regional corporations, which then distributed shares of stock to Natives in the region or village. The shares paid dividends based on both the settlement and corporation profits. To pipeline developers, the most important aspect of ANCSA was the clause dictating that no Native allotments could be selected in the path of the pipeline.

Another objection of the natives was the potential for the pipeline to disrupt a traditional way of life. Many natives were worried that the disruption caused by the pipeline would scare away the whales and caribou that are relied upon for food.

== Legal issues and politics ==
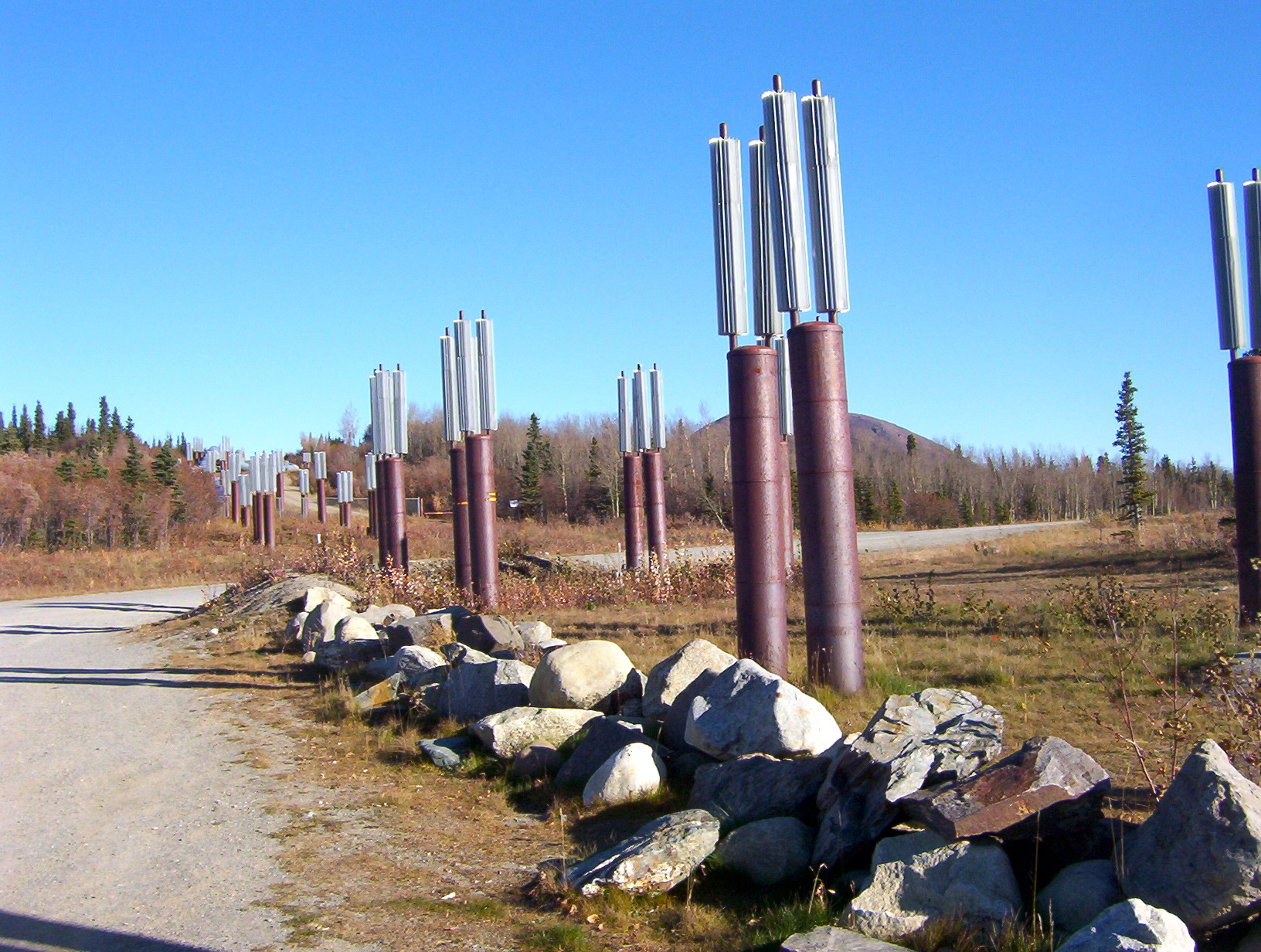
Most road crossings are simply buried deep, but this crossing on the Richardson Highway is close to the surface and employs thermosyphons, special heat pipes that conduct heat from the oil to the fins at the top of the pipes in order to avoid thawing the permafrost

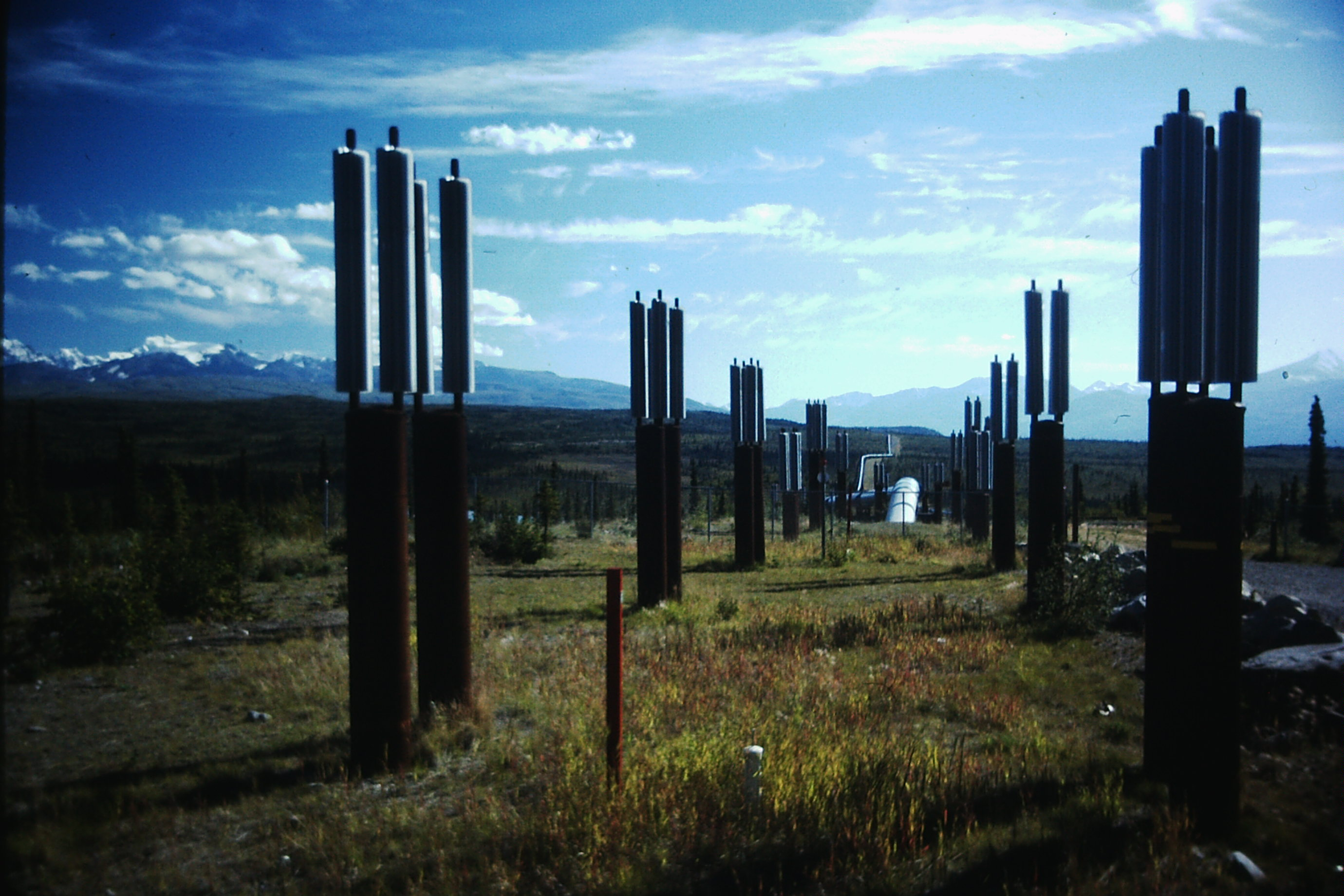
Alyeska, buried pipeline with heat pipes, summer 1987

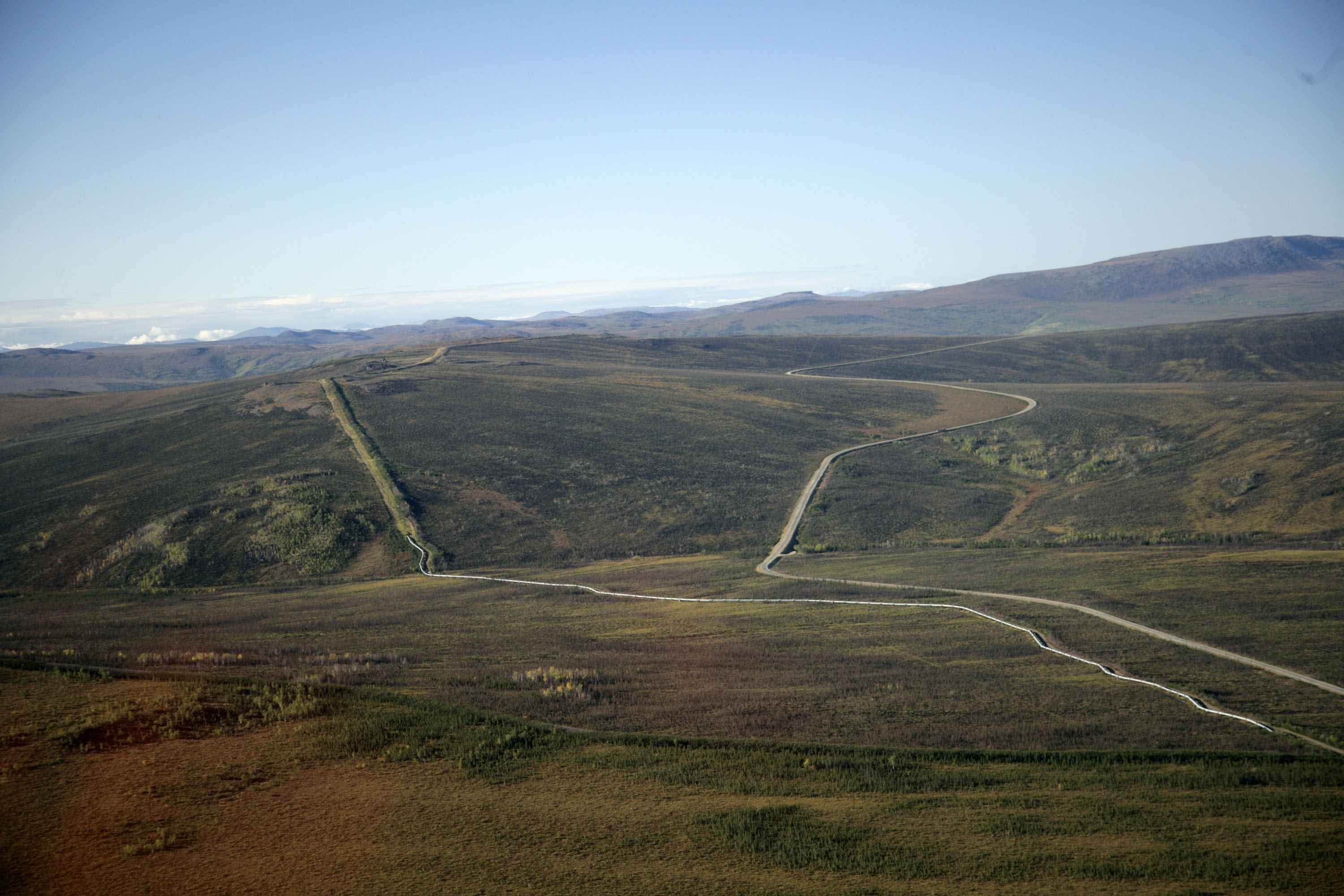
TAPS and the Dalton Highway crossing the Kanuti National Wildlife Refuge

In both the courts and Congress, Alyeska and the oil companies fought for the pipeline's construction amidst opposition concerning the pipeline's EIS (environmental impact statement). The arguments continued through 1971. Objections about the caribou herds were countered by observations of Davidson Ditch, a water pipeline with the same diameter of the Trans-Alaska Pipeline, which caribou were able to jump over. To those who argued that the pipeline would irrevocably alter Alaska wilderness, proponents pointed to the overgrown remnants of the Fairbanks Gold Rush, most of which had been erased 70 years later. Some pipeline opponents were satisfied by Alyeska's preliminary design, which incorporated underground and raised crossings for caribou and other big game, gravel and styrofoam insulation to prevent permafrost melting, automatic leak detection and shutoff, and other techniques. Other opponents, including fishermen who feared tanker leaks south of Valdez, maintained their disagreement with the plan.

All the arguments both for and against the pipeline were incorporated into the 3,500-page, 9-volume final environmental impact statement, which was released on March 20, 1972. Although Alaska Sen. Ted Stevens felt the statement "was not written by a proponent," it maintained the general approval for pipeline construction that was demonstrated in the draft statement. U.S. Secretary of the Interior Rogers Morton allowed 45 days of comment after the release, and conservationists created a 1,300-page document opposing the impact statement. This document failed to sway Judge Hart, who lifted the injunction on the project on August 15, 1972.

The environmental groups that had filed the injunction appealed the decision, and on October 6, 1972, the U.S. District Court of Appeals in Washington, D.C., partially reversed Hart's decision. The appeals court said that although the impact statement followed the guidelines set by the National Environmental Policy Act, it did not follow the Minerals Leasing Act, which allowed for a smaller pipeline right of way than was required for the Trans-Alaska Pipeline. The oil companies and Alyeska appealed this decision to the U.S. Supreme Court, but in April 1973, the court declined to hear the case.

=== Congressional issues ===
With the appeals court having decided that the Minerals Leasing Act did not cover the pipeline's requirements, Alyeska and the oil companies began lobbying Congress to either amend the act or create a new law that would permit a larger right-of-way. The Senate Interior Committee began the first hearings on a series of bills to that effect on March 9, 1973. Environmental opposition switched from contesting the pipeline on NEPA grounds to fighting an amendment to the leasing act or a new bill. By the spring and summer of 1973, these opposition groups attempted to persuade Congress to endorse a Trans-Canada oil pipeline or a railroad. They believed the "leave it in the ground" argument was doomed to fail, and the best way to oppose the pipeline would be to propose an ineffective alternative which could be easily defeated. The problem with this approach was that any such alternative would cover more ground and be more damaging environmentally than the Trans-Alaska Pipeline.

Hearings in both the U.S. Senate and the House continued through the summer of 1973 on both new bills and amendments to the Mineral Leasing Act. On July 13, an amendment calling for more study of the project—the Mondale-Bayh Amendment—was defeated. This was followed by another victory for pipeline proponents when an amendment by Alaska Sen. Mike Gravel was passed by the Senate. The amendment declared that the pipeline project fulfilled all aspects of NEPA and modified the Mineral Leasing Act to allow the larger right-of-way for the Alaska pipeline. Upon reconsideration, the vote was tied at 49–49 and required the vote of vice president Spiro Agnew, who supported the amendment; a similar amendment was passed in the House on August 2.

=== Oil crisis and authorization act ===
On October 17, 1973, the Organization of Arab Petroleum Exporting Countries announced an oil embargo against the United States in retaliation for its support of Israel during the Yom Kippur War. Because the United States imported approximately 35 percent of its oil from foreign sources, the embargo had a major effect. The price of gasoline shot upward, gasoline shortages were common, and rationing was considered. Most Americans began demanding a solution to the problem, and President Richard Nixon began lobbying for the Trans-Alaska Pipeline as at least a part of the answer.

Nixon supported the pipeline project even before the oil crisis. On September 10, 1973, he released a message stating that the pipeline was his priority for the remainder of the Congressional session that year. On November 8, after the embargo had been in place for three weeks, he reaffirmed that statement. Members of Congress, under pressure from their constituents, created the Trans-Alaska Pipeline Authorization Act, which removed all legal barriers from construction of the pipeline, provided financial incentives, and granted a right-of-way for its construction. The act was drafted, rushed through committee, and approved by the House on November 12, 1973, by a vote of 361–14–60. The next day, the Senate passed it, 80–5–15. Nixon signed it into law on November 16, and a federal right-of-way for the pipeline and transportation highway was granted on January 3, 1974. The deal was signed by the oil companies on January 23, allowing work to start.

== Construction ==
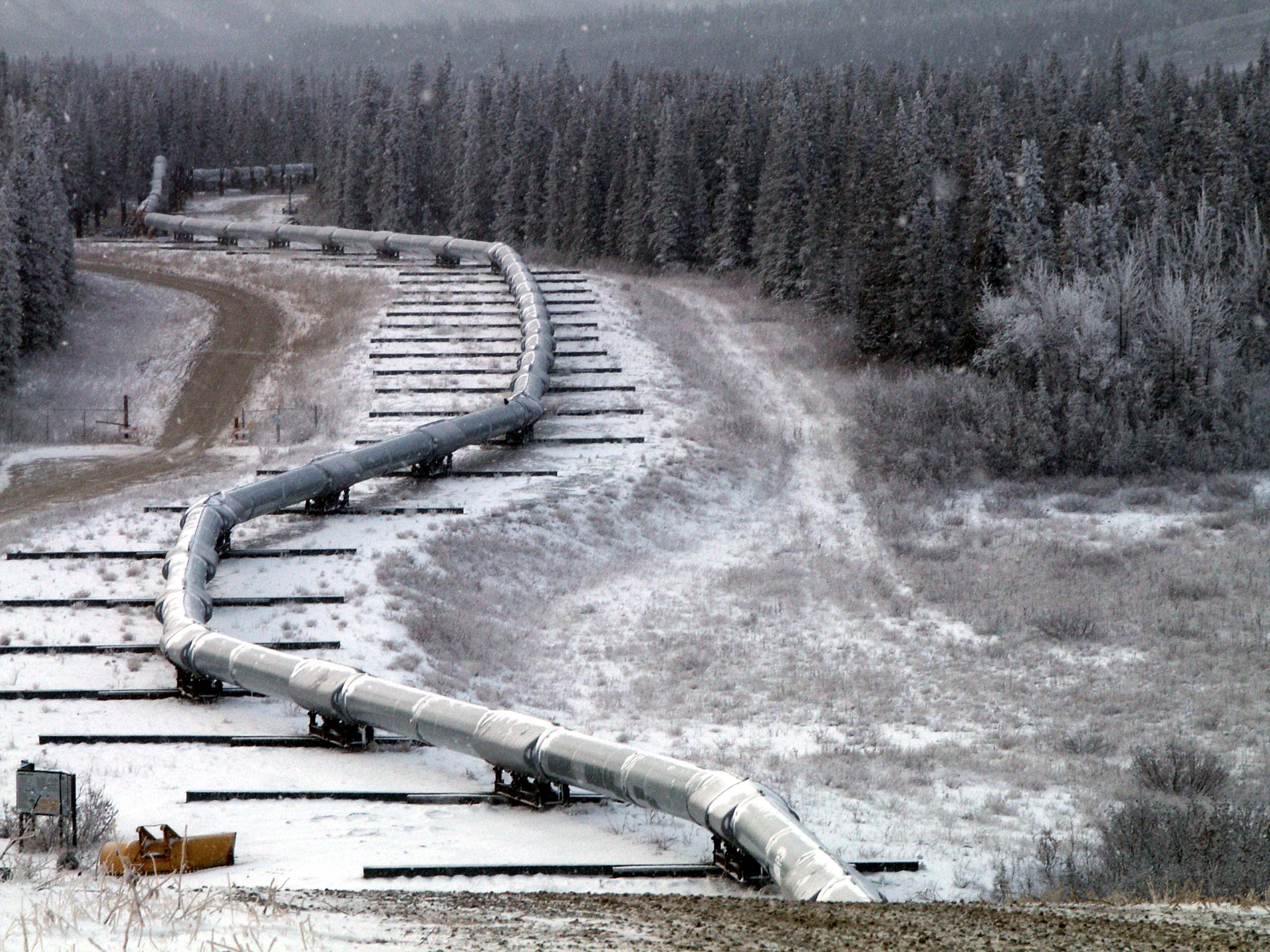
The pipeline is on slider supports where it crosses the Denali Fault.

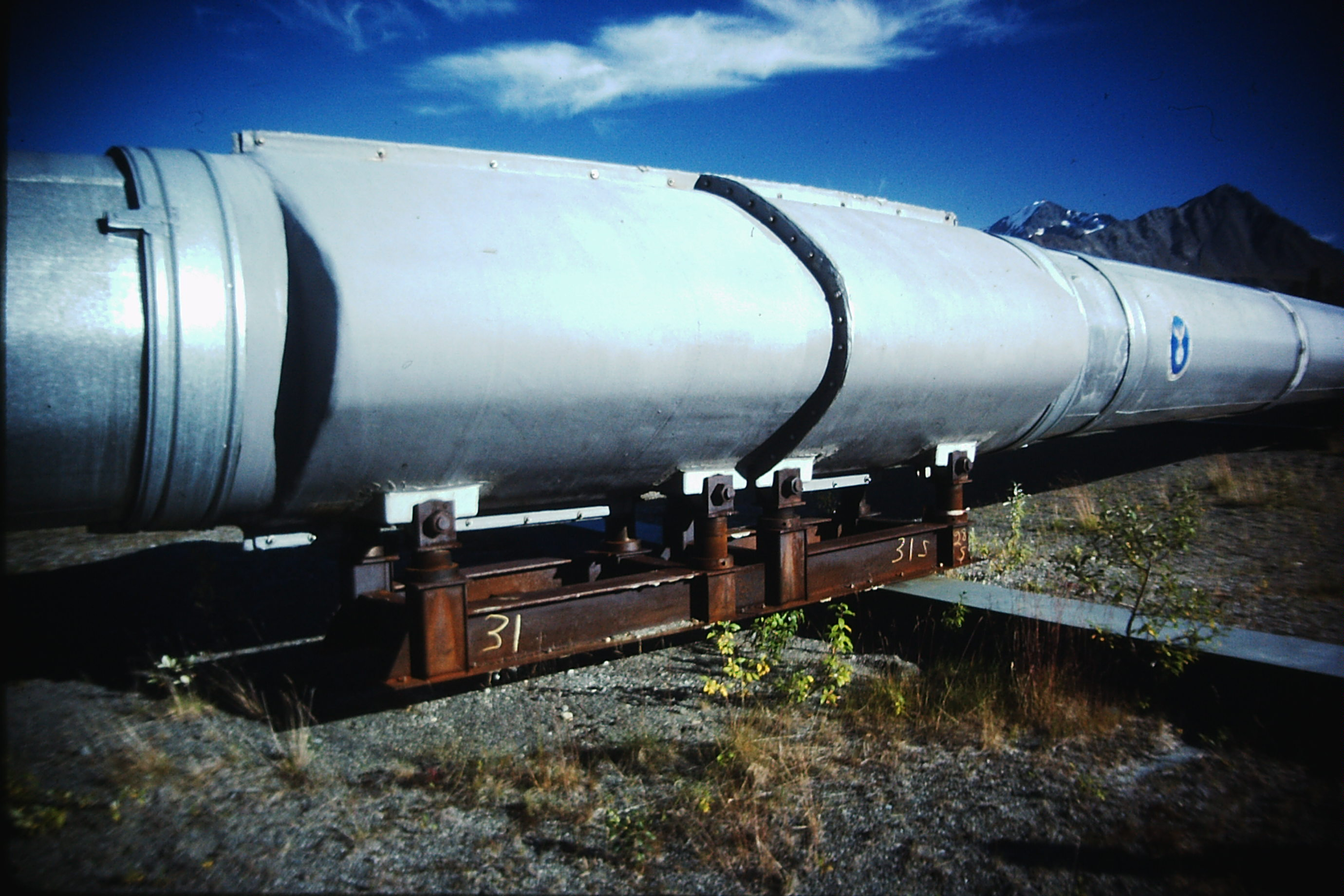
Alyeska pipeline on slide shoes, allowing movement in case of earthquakes

Although the legal right-of-way was cleared by January 1974, cold weather, the need to hire workers, and construction of the Dalton Highway meant work on the pipeline itself did not begin until March. Between 1974 and July 28, 1977, when the first barrel of oil reached Valdez, tens of thousands of people worked on the pipeline. Thousands of workers came to Alaska, attracted by the prospect of high-paying jobs at a time when most of the rest of the United States was undergoing a recession.

Construction workers endured long hours, cold temperatures, and brutal conditions. Difficult terrain, particularly in Atigun Pass, Keystone Canyon, and near the Sagavanirktok River forced workers to come up with solutions for unforeseen problems. Faulty welds and accusations of poor quality control caused a Congressional investigation that ultimately revealed little. More than $8 billion was spent to build the 800 miles (1,300 km) of pipeline, the Valdez Marine Terminal, and 12 pump stations. The construction effort also had a human toll. Thirty-two Alyeska and contract employees died from causes directly related to construction. That figure does not include common carrier casualties.

== Impact ==
=== Boomtowns ===
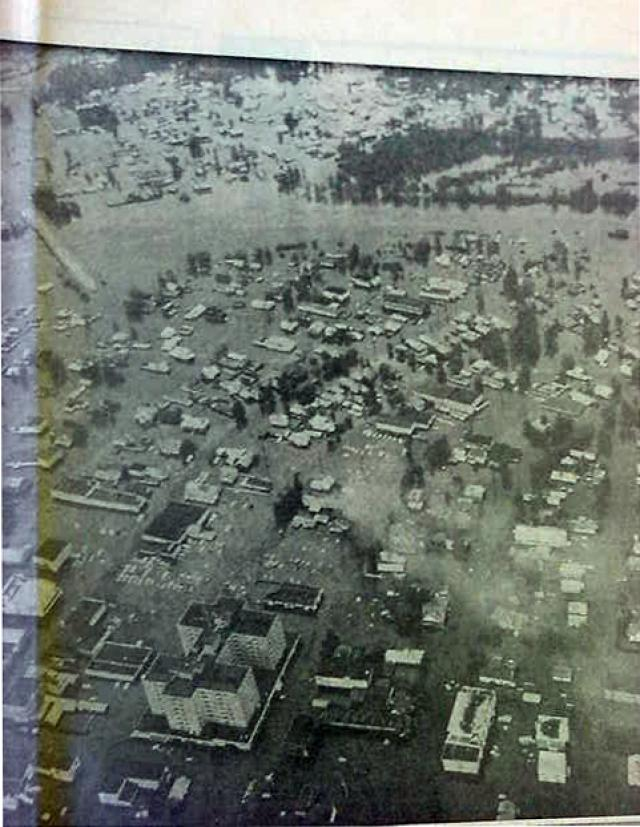
Water overflowed the banks of the Chena River in August 1967, flooding Fairbanks and Fort Wainwright.

Construction of the pipeline caused a massive economic boom in towns up and down the pipeline route. Prior to construction, most residents in towns like Fairbanks—still recovering from the devastating 1967 Fairbanks Flood—strongly supported the pipeline. By 1976, after the town's residents had endured a spike in crime, overstressed public infrastructure, and an influx of people unfamiliar with Alaska customs, 56 percent said the pipeline had changed Fairbanks for the worse. The boom was even greater in Valdez, where the population jumped from 1,350 in 1974 to 6,512 by the summer of 1975 and 8,253 in 1976.

This increase in population caused many adverse effects. Home prices skyrocketed—a home that sold for $40,000 in 1974 was purchased for $80,000 in 1975. In Valdez, lots of land that sold for $400 in the late 1960s went for $4,000 in 1973, $8,000 in 1974, and $10,000 in 1975. Home and apartment rentals were correspondingly squeezed upward by the rising prices and the demand from pipeline workers. Two-room log cabins with no plumbing rented for $500 per month. One two-bedroom home in Fairbanks housed 45 pipeline workers who shared beds on a rotating schedule for $40 per week. In Valdez, an apartment that rented for $286 per month in December 1974 cost $520 per month in March 1975 and $1,600 per month—plus two mandatory roommates—in April 1975. Hotel rooms were sold out as far away as Glenallen, 115 miles (185 km) north of Valdez.

The skyrocketing prices were driven by the high salaries paid to pipeline workers, who were eager to spend their money. The high salaries caused a corresponding demand for higher wages among non-pipeline workers in Alaska. Non-pipeline businesses often could not keep up with the demand for higher wages, and job turnover was high. Yellow cabs in Fairbanks had a turnover rate of 800 percent; a nearby restaurant had a turnover rate of more than 1,000 percent. Many positions were filled by high school students promoted above their experience level. To meet the demand, a Fairbanks high school ran in two shifts: one in the morning and the other in the afternoon in order to teach students who also worked eight hours per day. More wages and more people meant higher demand for goods and services. Waiting in line became a fact of life in Fairbanks, and the Fairbanks McDonald's became No. 2 in the world for sales—behind only the recently opened Stockholm store. Alyeska and its contractors bought in bulk from local stores, causing shortages of everything from cars to tractor parts, water softener salt, batteries and ladders.

The large sums of money being made and spent caused an upsurge in crime and illicit activity in towns along the pipeline route. This was exacerbated by the fact that police officers and state troopers resigned in large groups to become pipeline security guards at wages far in excess of those available in public-sector jobs. Fairbanks' Second Avenue became a notorious hangout for prostitutes, and dozens of bars operated throughout town. In 1975, the Fairbanks Police Department estimated between 40 and 175 prostitutes were working in the city of 15,000 people. Trouble was incited sometimes by prostitutes' pimps, who engaged in turf fights. In 1976, police responded to a shootout between warring pimps who wielded automatic firearms. By and large, however, the biggest police issue was the number of drunken brawls and fighting. On the pipeline itself, thievery was a major problem. Poor accounting and record keeping allowed large numbers of tools and large amounts of equipment to be stolen. The Los Angeles Times reported in 1975 that as many as 200 of Alyeska's 1,200 yellow-painted trucks were missing from Alaska and "scattered from Miami to Mexico City". Alyeska denied the problem and said only 20–30 trucks were missing. The theft problem was typified by pipeliners' practice of mailing empty boxes to pipeline camps. The boxes then would be filled with items and shipped out. After Alyeska ruled that all packages had to be sealed in the presence of a security guard, the number of packages being sent from camps dropped by 75 percent.

=== Economy of Alaska ===
The wealth generated by Prudhoe Bay and the other fields on the North Slope since 1977 is worth more than all the fish ever caught, all the furs ever trapped, all the trees chopped down; throw in all the copper, whalebone, natural gas, tin, silver, platinum, and anything else ever extracted from Alaska too. The balance sheet of Alaskan history is simple: One Prudhoe Bay is worth more in real dollars than everything that has been dug out, cut down, caught or killed in Alaska since the beginning of time.

— Alaska historian Terrence Cole

Since the completion of the Trans-Alaska Pipeline System in 1977, the government of the state of Alaska has been reliant on taxes paid by oil producers and shippers. Prior to 1976, Alaska's personal income tax rate was 14.5 percent—the highest in the United States. The gross state product was $8 billion, and Alaskans earned $5 billion in personal income. Thirty years after the pipeline began operating, the state had no personal income tax, the gross state product was $39 billion, and Alaskans earned $25 billion in personal income. Alaska moved from the most heavily taxed state to the most tax-free state.

The difference was the Trans-Alaska Pipeline System and the taxes and revenue it brought to Alaska. Alyeska and the oil companies injected billions of dollars into the Alaska economy during the construction effort and the years afterward. In addition, the taxes paid by those companies altered the tax structure of the state. By 1982, five years after the pipeline started transporting oil, 86.5 percent of Alaska revenue came directly from the petroleum industry.

The series of taxes levied on oil production in Alaska has changed several times since 1977, but the overall form remains mostly the same. Alaska receives royalties from oil production on state land. The state also has a property tax on oil production structures and transportation (pipeline) property—the only state property tax in Alaska. There is a special corporate income tax on petroleum companies, and the state taxes the amount of petroleum produced. This production tax is levied on the cost of oil at Pump Station 1. To calculate this tax, the state takes the market value of the oil, subtracts transportation costs (tanker and pipeline tariffs), subtracts production costs, then multiplies the resulting amount per barrel of oil produced each month. The state then takes a percentage of the dollar figure produced.

Under the latest taxation system, introduced by former governor Sarah Palin in 2007 and passed by the Alaska Legislature that year, the maximum tax rate on profits is 50 percent. The rate fluctuates based on the cost of oil, with lower prices incurring lower tax rates. The state also claims 12.5 percent of all oil produced in the state. This "royalty oil" is not taxed but is sold back to the oil companies, generating additional revenue. At a local level, the pipeline owners pay property taxes on the portions of the pipeline and the pipeline facilities that lay within districts that impose a property tax. This property tax is based on the pipeline's value (as assessed by the state) and the local property tax rate. In the Fairbanks North Star Borough, for example, pipeline owners paid $9.2 million in property taxes—approximately 10 percent of all property taxes paid in the borough.

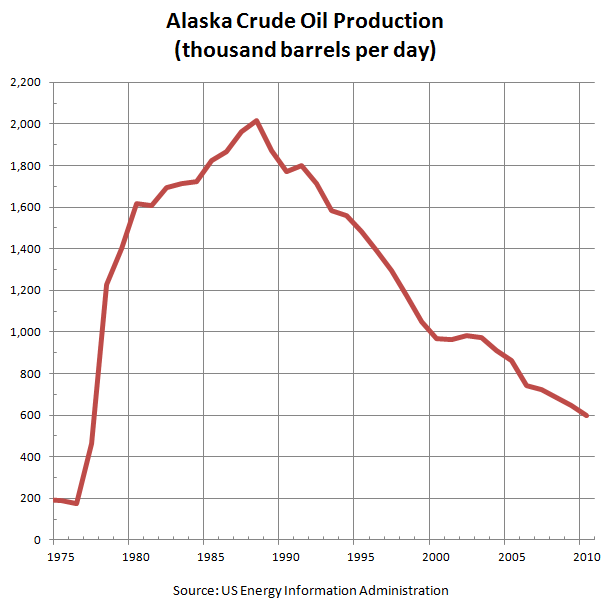
Alaska oil production peaked in 1988.

The enormous amount of public revenue created by the pipeline provoked debates about what to do with the windfall. The record $900 million created by the Prudhoe Bay oil lease sale took place at a time when the entire state budget was less than $118 million, yet the entire amount created by the sale was used up by 1975. Taxes on the pipeline and oil carried by it promised to bring even more money into state coffers. To ensure that oil revenue wasn't spent as it came in, the Alaska Legislature and governor Jay Hammond proposed the creation of an Alaska Permanent Fund—a long-term savings account for the state. This measure required a constitutional amendment, which was duly passed in November 1976. The amendment requires at least 25 percent of mineral extraction revenue to be deposited in the Permanent Fund. On February 28, 1977, the first deposit—$734,000—was put into the Permanent Fund. That deposit and subsequent ones were invested entirely in bonds, but debates quickly arose about the style of investments and what they should be used for.

In 1980, the Alaska Legislature created the Alaska Permanent Fund Corporation to manage the investments of the Permanent Fund, and it passed the Permanent Fund Dividend program, which provided for annual payments to Alaskans from the interest earned by the fund. After two years of legal arguments about who should be eligible for payments, the first checks were distributed to Alaskans. After peaking at more than $40 billion in 2007, the fund's value declined to approximately $26 billion as of summer 2009. In addition to the Permanent Fund, the state also maintains the Constitutional Budget Reserve, a separate savings account established in 1990 after a legal dispute over pipeline tariffs generated a one-time payment of more than $1.5 billion from the oil companies. The Constitutional Budget reserve is run similar to the Permanent Fund, but money from it can be withdrawn to pay for the state's annual budget, unlike the Permanent Fund.

=== Oil prices ===
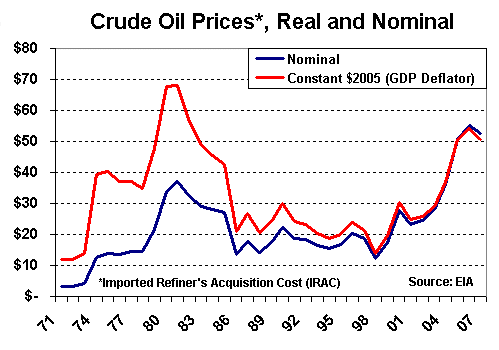
Nominal and Real Price of Oil, 1971–2007

Although the Trans-Alaska Pipeline System began pumping oil in 1977, it did not have a major immediate impact on global oil prices. This is partly because it took several years to reach full production and partly because U.S. production outside Alaska declined until the mid-1980s. The Iranian Revolution and OPEC price increases triggered the 1979 energy crisis despite TAPS production increases. Oil prices remained high until the late 1980s, when a stable international situation, the removal of price controls, and the peak of production at Prudhoe Bay contributed to the 1980s oil glut. In 1988, TAPS was delivering 25 percent of all U.S. oil production. As North Slope oil production declined, so did TAPS's share of U.S. production. Today, TAPS provides less than 17 percent of U.S. oil production.

=== Social impact ===
The pipeline attracts tens of thousands of visitors annually on pipeline tourism trips. Notable visitors have included Henry Kissinger, Jamie Farr, John Denver, President Gerald Ford, King Olav V of Norway, and Gladys Knight. Knight starred in one of two movies about the pipeline construction, Pipe Dreams and Joyride, both were critically panned. Other films, such as On Deadly Ground and 30 Days of Night, refer to the pipeline or use it as a plot device.

The Alistair Maclean novel, "Athabasca", published 1980, also deals with a sabotage threat against both the Alaska Pipeline and the Athabasca tar sands in Canada.

The pipeline has also inspired various forms of artwork. The most notable form of art unique to the pipeline are pipeline maps—portions of scrap pipe cut into the shape of Alaska with a piece of metal delineating the path of the pipeline through the map. Pipeline maps were frequently created by welders working on the pipeline, and the maps were frequently sold to tourists or given away as gifts. Other pipeline-inspired pieces of art include objects containing crude oil that has been transported through the pipeline.

== Technical details ==
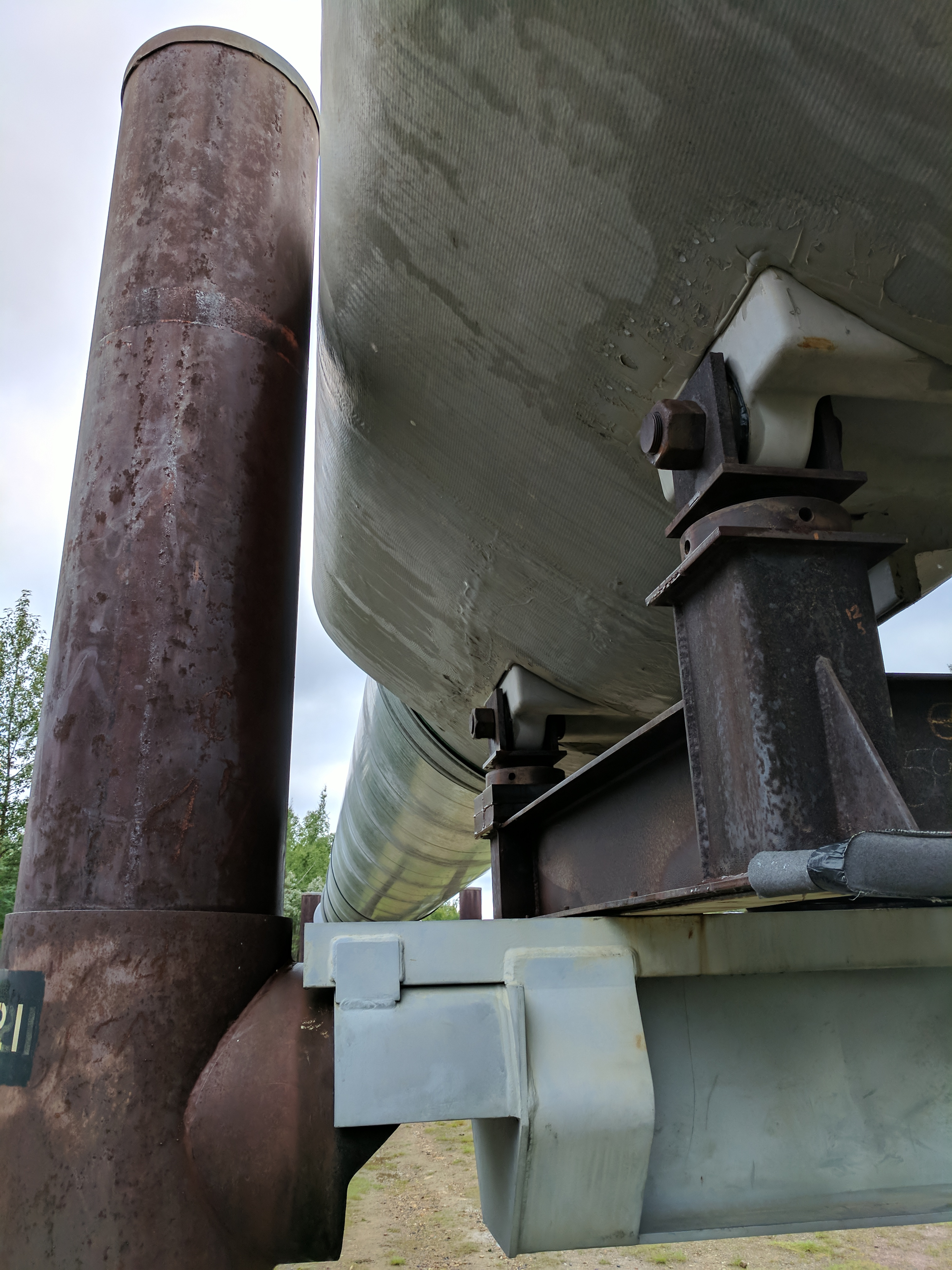
The pipeline simply rests on its supports; it is not actually welded or otherwise affixed in place. This is necessary because the air temperature swings by over 150 °F (83 °C) from winter to summer, causing extreme heat expansion: the pipeline, when empty, could shift 12 feet in an 1800 ft section. The pipeline was constructed 11 miles "too long" to account for this (i.e., 800 miles of zig-zagging pipe instead of 789 linear miles of pipe).

Oil going into the Trans-Alaska Pipeline comes from one of several oil fields on Alaska's North Slope. The Prudhoe Bay Oil Field, the one most commonly associated with the pipeline, contributes oil, as do the Kuparuk, Alpine, Endicott, and Liberty oil fields, among others. Oil emerges from the ground at approximately 120 °F (49 °C) and cools to 111 °F (44 °C) by the time it reaches Pump Station 1 through feeder pipelines that stretch across the North Slope. North Slope crude oil has a specific gravity of 29.9 API at 60 °F (16 °C). Pipeline flow rate has been steady from 2013 to 2018, hovering just over half a million barrels per day. The minimum flow year was 2015 which averaged 508,446 barrels per day (80,836.5 m^{3}/d), which is less than its theoretical maximum capacity of 2.14 million barrels per day (340,000 m^{3}/d) or its actual maximum of 2.03 million barrels per day (323,000 m^{3}/d) in 1988. From Pump Station 1, the average time taken by the oil to travel the entire length of the pipeline to Valdez has increased from 4.5 days to 18 days from 1988 to 2018.

The minimum flow through the pipeline is not as clearly defined as its maximum. Operating at lower flows will extend the life of the pipeline as well as increasing profit for its owners. The 2012 flow of 600,000 bbl/d is significantly less than what the pipeline was designed for. Low flowrates require that the oil move slower through the line, meaning that its temperature drops more than in high-flow situations. A freeze in the line would block a pig in the line, which would force a shutdown and repairs. A 2011 engineering report by Alyeska stated that, to avoid freezing, heaters would need to be installed at several pump stations. This report noted that these improvements could bring flow as low as 350,000 bbl/d, but it did not attempt to determine the absolute minimum. Other studies have suggested that the minimum is 70,000 to 100,000 bbl/d with the current pipeline. Alyeska could also replace the 48" pipeline from Prudhoe Bay to Fairbanks with a 20" pipeline and use rail the rest of the way, which would allow as little as 45,000 bbl/d.

Pumping stations maintain the momentum of the oil as it goes through the pipeline. Pump Station 1 is the northernmost of 11 pump stations spread across the length of the pipeline. The original design called for 12 pump stations with 4 pumps each, but Pump Station 11 was never built. Nevertheless, the pump stations retained their intended naming system. Eight stations were operating at startup, and this number increased to 11 by 1980 as throughput rose. As of December 2024, only four stations were moving oil -- Pump Stations 1, 4, 5 and 9. The pumps are natural-gas or liquid-fueled turbines.

Because of meanders and thermal and seismic accommodations, the amount of 48-inch-diameter (1,200 mm) welded steel pipeline between the pipe stations and the end of the line is 800.3 miles (1,288.0 km), while the linear distance between the Prudhoe Bay and Valdez station endpoints is 639.34 miles (1,028.92 km). The pipeline crosses 34 major streams or rivers and nearly 500 minor ones. Its highest point is at Atigun Pass, where the pipeline is 4,739 feet (1,444 m) above sea level. The maximum grade of the pipeline is 145%, at Thompson Pass in the Chugach Mountains. The pipeline was created in 40 and 60-foot (12.2 and 18.3-meter) sections. Forty-two thousand of these sections were welded together to make a double joint, which was laid in place on the line. Sixty-six thousand "field girth welds" were needed to join the double joints into a continuous pipeline. The pipe is of two different thicknesses: 466 miles (750 km) of it is 0.462 inches (1.17 cm) thick, while the remaining 334 miles (538 km) is 0.562 inches (1.43 cm) thick. More than 78,000 vertical support members hold up the aboveground sections of pipeline, and the pipeline contains 178 valves.

At the end of the pipeline is the Valdez Marine Terminal, which can store 9.18 million barrels (1,460,000 m^{3}) of oil across eighteen storage tanks. They are 63.3 feet (19.3 m) tall and 250 feet (76 m) in diameter. They average 85% full at any given time—7.8 million barrels (1,240,000 m^{3}). Three power plants at the terminal generate 12.5 megawatts each. Four tanker berths are available for mooring ships in addition to two loading berths, where oil pumping takes place. More than 19,000 tankers have been filled by the marine terminal since 1977.

== Maintenance ==
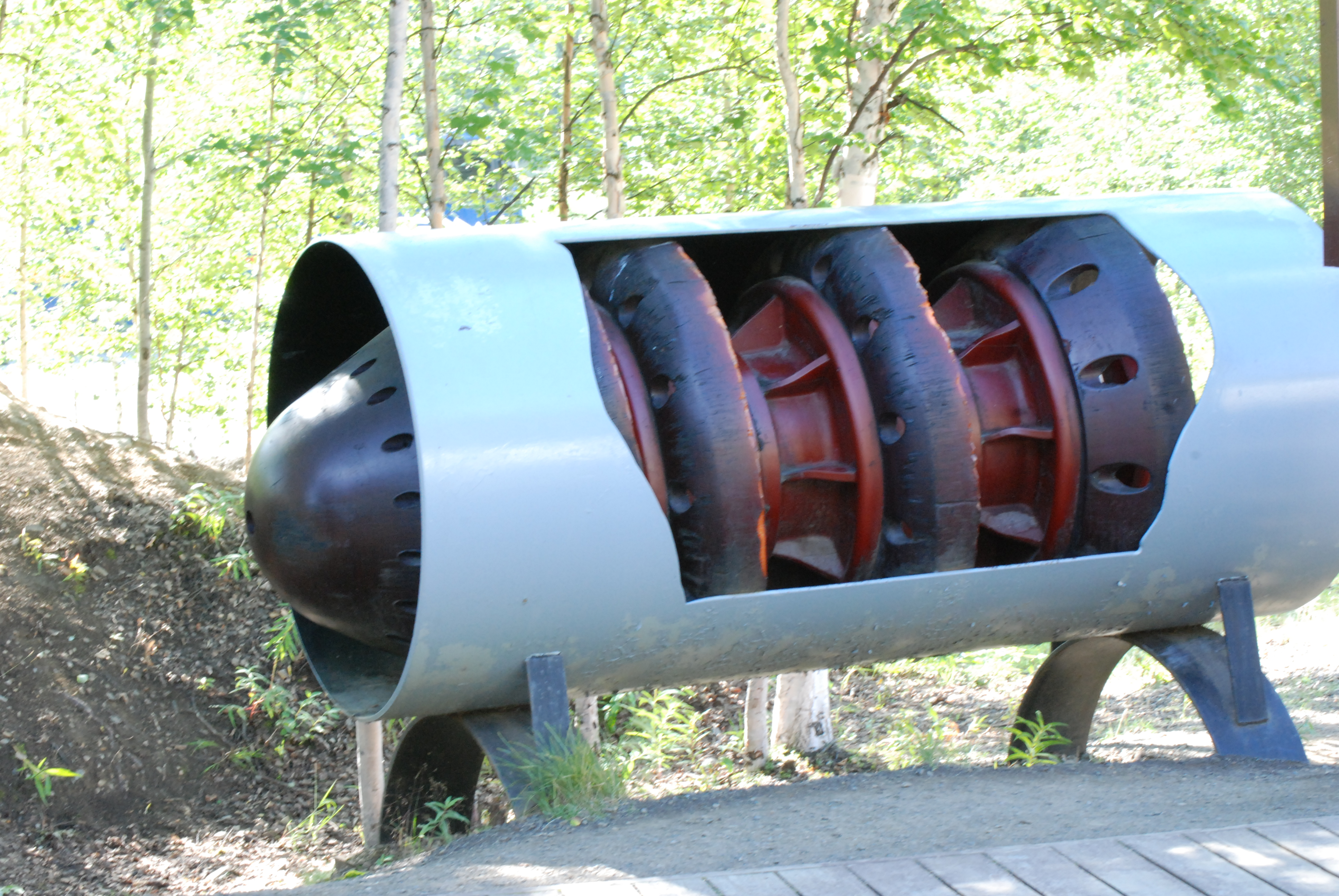
This scraper pig was retired from use in the pipeline and is on display near Fairbanks (2007).

The pipeline is surveyed several times per day, mostly by air. Foot and road patrols also take place to check for problems such as leaks or pipe settling or shifting. The pipeline can be surveyed in as little as twenty one days, but most surveys take longer to ensure thoroughness. These external inspections are only part of standard maintenance, however. The majority of pipeline maintenance is done by pipeline pigs—mechanical devices sent through the pipeline to perform a variety of functions.

The most common pig is the scraper pig, which removes wax that precipitates out of the oil and collects on the walls of the pipeline. The colder the oil, the more wax buildup. This buildup can cause a variety of problems, so regular "piggings" are needed to keep the pipe clear. A second type of pig (viz. intelligent/smart pig) travels through the pipe and looks for corrosion. Corrosion-detecting pigs use either magnetic or ultrasonic sensors. Magnetic sensors detect corrosion by analyzing variations in the magnetic field of the pipeline's metal. Ultrasonic testing pigs detect corrosion by examining vibrations in the walls of the pipeline. Other types of pigs look for irregularities in the shape of the pipeline, such as if it is bending or buckling. "Smart" pigs, which contain a variety of sensors, can perform multiple tasks. Typically, these pigs are inserted at Prudhoe Bay and travel the length of the pipeline. In July 2009, a pig launcher was installed at Pump Station 8, near the midpoint of the pipeline.

A third type of common maintenance is the installation and replacement of sacrificial anodes along the subterranean portions of pipeline. These anodes reduce the corrosion caused by electrochemical action that affect these interred sections of pipeline. Excavation and replacement of the anodes is required as they corrode.

== Incidents ==
Reported oil spills
Year	No. of spills	Amount spilled (bbl)
1977	34	1,932
1978	24	16,013
1979	43	5,566
1980	55	3,531
1981	32	1,508
1982	30	39
1983	17	4
1984	32	78
1985	31	27
1986	40	38
1987	37	4
1988	35	14
1989	26	251,712
1990	31	6.06
1991	54	11
1992	55	19.5
1993	65	8.6
1994	44	324
1995	6	2
1996	12	814
1997	5	2
1998	5	0.5
1999	4	0.07
2000	3	3.9
2001	11	6,857
2002	9	0.1
2003	3	0.31
2004	0	0
2005	0	0
2006	3	1.33
2007	4	21.64
2008	1	0.10
2009	2	0.93
2010	2	2,580.12
2011	4	308.39
2012	4	5.92
2013	5	1.26
2014	0	0
2015	5	5.33

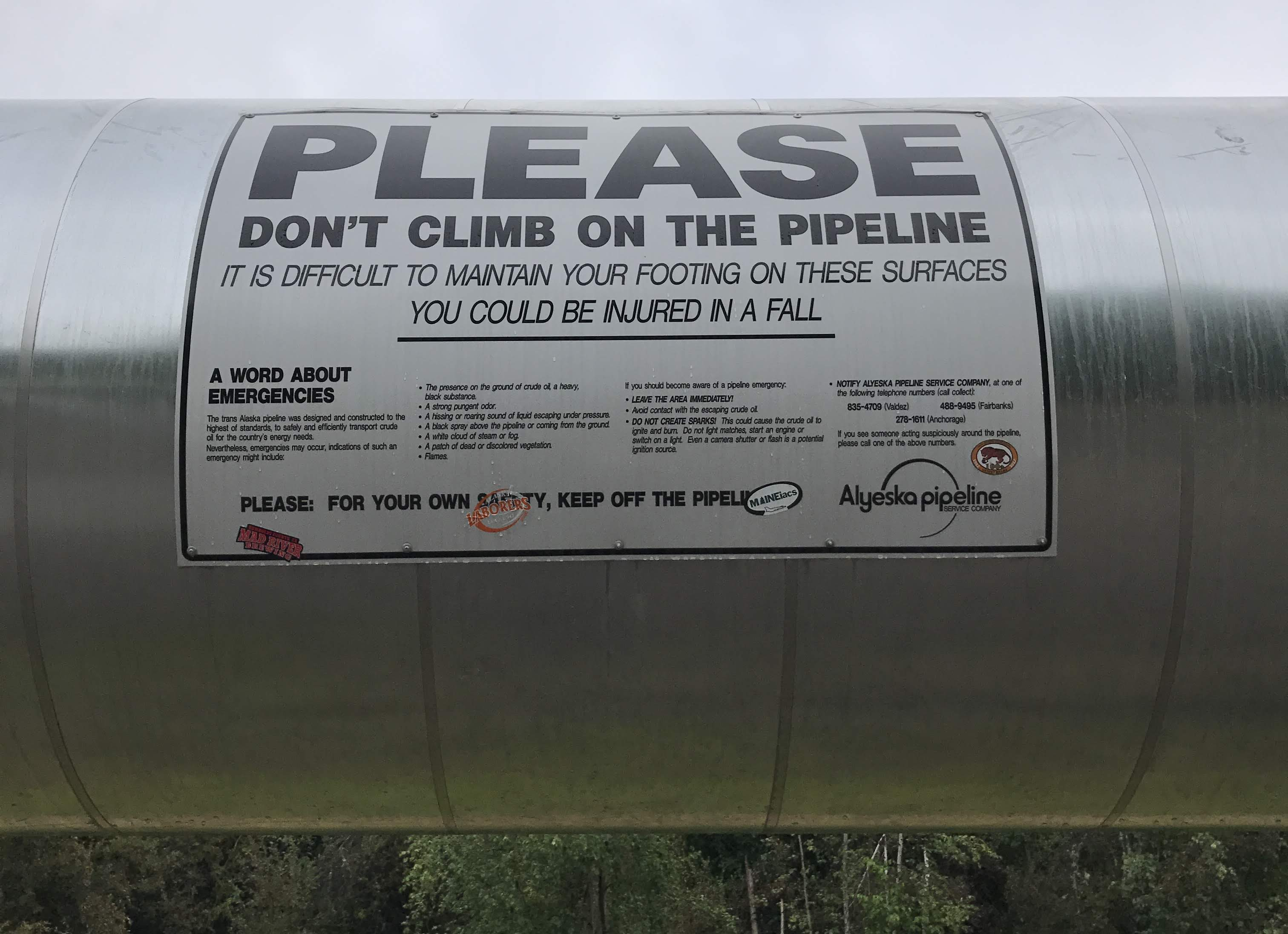
The massive length and remoteness of the pipeline make it more or less impossible to secure

The pipeline has at times been damaged due to sabotage, human error, maintenance failures, and natural disasters. By law, Alyeska is required to report significant oil spills to regulatory authorities. The Exxon Valdez oil spill is the best-known accident involving Alaska oil, but it did not involve the pipeline itself. Following the spill, Alyeska created a rapid response force that is paid for by the oil companies, including ExxonMobil, which was found liable for the spill.

An explosion on July 8, 1977, Pump Station No. 8, killed one worker, injured five others, and destroyed a pump station. A Congressional committee later announced the cause was workers not following the proper procedures, causing crude oil to flow into a pump under repair at the time. In its first two months of operation, from June 20 to August 15, 1977, seven incidents and accidents caused the pipeline to be shut down periodically. The NTSB investigated the system, and made recommendations.

The largest oil spill involving the main pipeline took place on February 15, 1978, when an unknown individual blew a 1-inch (2.54-centimeter) hole in it at Steele Creek, just east of Fairbanks. Approximately 16,000 barrels (2,500 m^{3}) of oil leaked out of the hole before the pipeline was shut down. After more than 21 hours, it was restarted.

The steel pipe is resistant to gunshots and has resisted them on several occasions, but on October 4, 2001, a drunken gunman named Daniel Carson Lewis shot a hole into a weld near Livengood, causing the second-largest mainline oil spill in pipeline history. Approximately 6,144 barrels (976.8 m^{3}) leaked from the pipeline; 4,238 barrels (673.8 m^{3}) were recovered and reinjected into the pipeline. Nearly 2 acres (8,100 m^{2}) of tundra were soiled and were removed in the cleanup. The pipeline was repaired and was restarted more than 60 hours later. Lewis was found guilty in December 2002 of criminal mischief, assault, drunken driving, oil pollution, and misconduct.

The pipeline was built to withstand earthquakes, forest fires, and other natural disasters. The 2002 Denali earthquake occurred along a fault line that passed directly underneath the pipeline. The slider supports in that particular 1,900-foot section of the pipeline, right over the fault line, were designed to accommodate the ground slipping 20 feet horizontally and 5 vertically. In this 7.9 magnitude earthquake, the ground shifted 14 feet horizontally and 2.5 vertically. The pipeline did not break, but some slider supports were damaged, and the pipeline shut down for more than 66 hours as a precaution. In 2004, wildfires overran portions of the pipeline, but it was not damaged and did not shut down.

In May 2010, as much as several thousands of barrels were spilled from a pump station near Fort Greely during a scheduled shutdown. A relief valve control circuit failed during a test of the fire control system, and oil poured into a tank and overflowed onto a secondary containment area.

A leak was discovered on January 8, 2011, in the basement of the booster pump at Pump Station 1. For more than 80 hours, pipeline flow was reduced to 5 percent of normal. An oil collection system was put in place, and full flow resumed until the pipeline was again shut down while a bypass was installed to avoid the leaking section.

Heavy rains in Alaska have brought flooding uncomfortably close to the pipeline in recent years. In May 2019, the Dietrich River flooded north of Coldfoot, eroding 25–50 feet of riverbank, necessitating emergency work that left only an 80-foot buffer between the river and the pipeline. A few months later, in August, the Sagavanirktok River flooded, eroding 100 feet of river bank, and leaving only a 30-foot buffer between the river and the pipeline. The Lowe River also flooded near the pipeline in March 2019, and again in June 2020. Although Alyeska appears to be responding by stockpiling construction and emergency response materials, and has installed ground chillers beneath a stretch of pipeline 57 miles northwest of Fairbanks, comprehensive information on plans for addressing pipeline breaks in "high consequence areas" is not readily available.

In 2021, the pipeline was damaged due to thawing permafrost for the first time. Permafrost, which is ground that has been frozen for more than two years, is essential to the integrity of the pipeline. About 57 miles northwest of Fairbanks, thawing permafrost caused slope creep, which in turn caused the supports of the pipeline to twist and bend. Alyeska Corporation had to petition the Alaska Department of Natural Resources to conduct emergency defensive work to keep the permafrost stable.

== 21st century ==
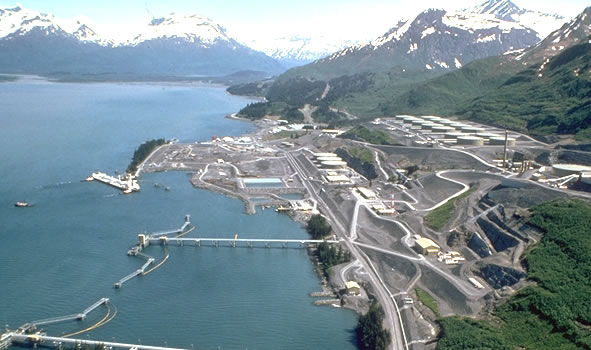
The pipeline terminal in Valdez

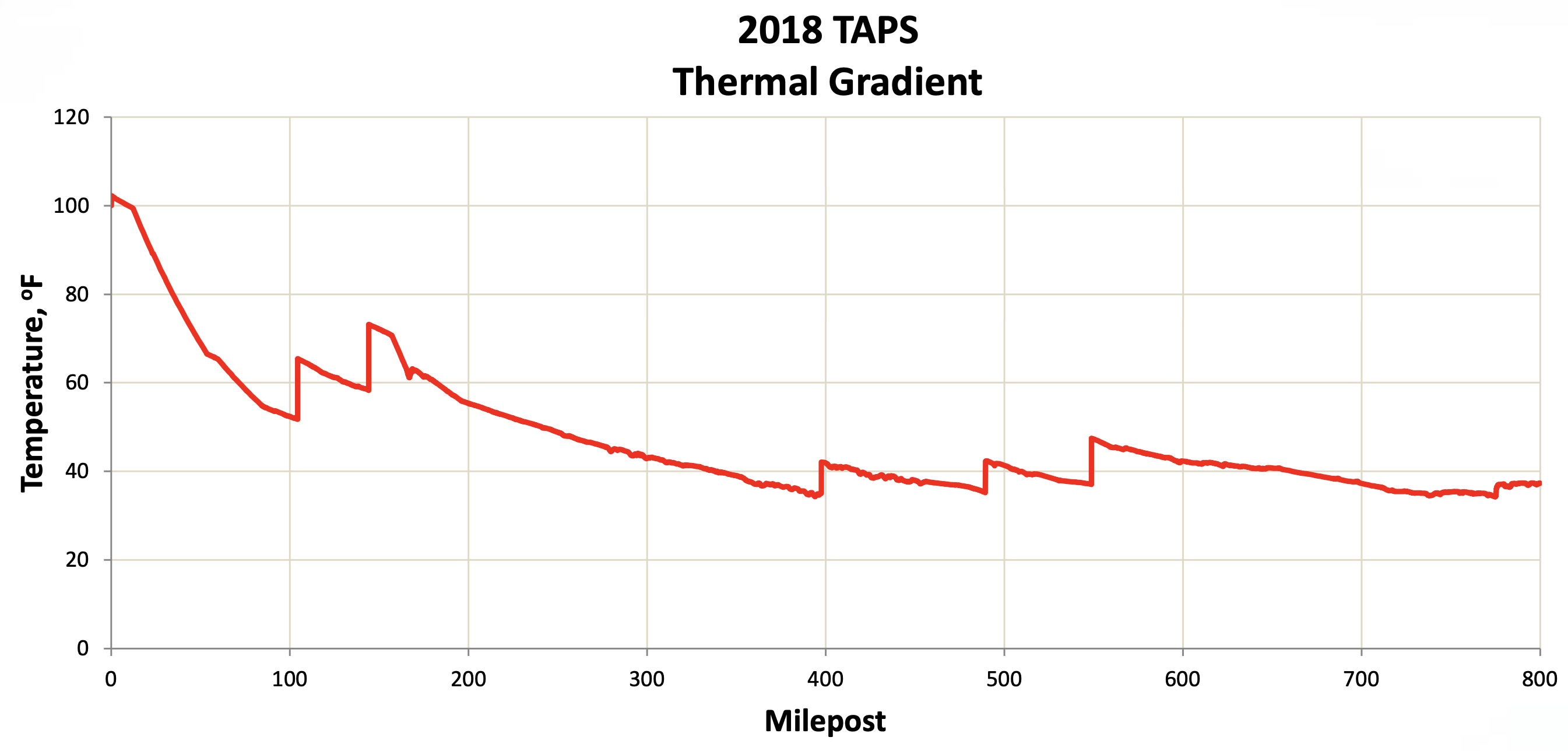
The temperature along the length of the line, as of early 2019. This visually demonstrates the effects of heaters at each Pump Station that increase the temperature.

The original design for the pipeline in the early 1970s called for a 25-year useful life with an expected 10 billion barrels of Prudhoe Bay oil production. By most economic, engineering and construction measures, the Alaska Pipeline has been a huge success. However, since the early 2000s, declines in oil production have posed a serious problem for the pipeline. As the flow rate slows, oil spends more time in the pipeline, which allows it to cool much further while travelling to Valdez. It cannot be allowed to fall below freezing (32 °F), otherwise the pipeline could seize up, crack, and rupture, as the water content would separate from the oil and freeze in place. A "Low Flow Impact Study" conducted by the pipeline operators, Alyeska, concluded in June 2011 that the minimum flow for the pipeline as it currently existed was 300,000 to 350,000 barrels per day in the winter.

This minimum flow rate is a legally contentious figure, since the taxable value of the pipeline is largely dependent on how long it can be operated. In late 2011, the Alaska Superior Court ruled that Alyeska's low flow study was invalid, and it ruled in favor of an internal BP study. The BP study concluded that with the installation of heaters along the pipeline route, the minimum flow could be lowered to 70,000 barrels per day (11,000 m^{3}/d). This court ruling increased ninefold the taxed property value of the pipeline. A study by the National Resources Defense Council that was also cited in this court case put specific numbers to this suggestion, and concluded that an investment of $0.8 billion in shoring up the pipeline could extend its lifespan long enough to extract an additional $28 billion of oil from existing wells alone. This NRDC study additionally explained: "This is a lower minimum throughput level than what is implied in Alyeska’s Low Flow Impact Study (LoFIS). We did not use the minimum throughput level implied by LoFIS because we have serious reservations about the assumptions used in the study and the LoFIS does not provide adequate data to support its claims."

The Trans-Alaska Pipeline System Renewal Environmental Impact Statement estimated in 2010 that flow levels would be workable through at least 2032 due to ongoing exploration outside ANWR. Improvements that allow low flow-rates could extend its lifespan as far as 2075.

As the pipeline's flow has diminished, its ownership has fluctuated. In 2000, as Exxon and Mobil merged, Mobil sold its 3.1% stake in the pipeline to Williams Companies as a condition of the merger. Three years later, Williams sold that share to Koch Alaska Pipeline Company, a subsidiary of Koch Industries. Nine years later, Koch announced it would sell its share to the other pipeline owners, as did Unocal, which had held a small ownership share since 1970. In 2019, BP announced plans to sell its Alaska operations to Hilcorp Energy Company. The deal, which closed in 2020, included BP's 49.1% ownership share of the Trans-Alaska Pipeline System. Opponents of the deal expressed concerns that Hilcorp, which did not fully disclose its finances, will lack the resources and expertise needed to address flooding and thawing-related safety concerns resulting from climate change.

By the terms of its land grants and leases, the owners of the Alaska Pipeline will be required to remove the pipeline and supporting equipment at the end of its life, except for cleaned and capped underground pipes. This multi-billion-dollar project is required to be paid for out of funds specifically charged to oil transport customers for this purpose, though as of 2004 these funds were co-mingled with other money and the amount needed was in dispute.

== See also ==
- Alaska gas pipeline, proposed
- Boeing RC-1, a proposed cargo aircraft to transport the oil from Alaska
- Canol pipeline
- Dalton Highway, which parallels the northern section of the pipeline
- Prudhoe Bay oil spill
- Athabasca, the novel by Alistair MacLean where the pipeline is prominently featured

== Additional sources ==
- Allen, Lawrence J. The Trans-Alaska Pipeline. Vol 1: The Beginning. Vol 2: South to Valdez. Seattle; Scribe Publishing Co. 1975 and 1976.
- Alyeska Pipeline Service Co. Alyeska: A 30-Year Journey. Alyeska Pipeline Service Co., 2007.
- Baring-Gould, Michael and Bennett, Marsha. Social Impact of the Trans-Alaska Oil Pipeline Construction in Valdez, Alaska 1974–1975. Anchorage; University of Alaska Anchorage, 1976.
- Brown, Tom. Oil on Ice: Alaskan Wilderness at the Crossroads. Edited by Richard Pollack. San Francisco; Sierra Club Battlebook, 1980.
- Dixon, Mim. What Happened to Fairbanks? The Effects of the Trans-Alaska Oil Pipeline on the Community of Fairbanks, Alaska. Social Impact Assessment Series. Boulder, Colorado; Westview Press, 1978.
- Dobler, Bruce. The Last Rush North. Boston; Little, Brown & Company, 1976.
- Fineberg, Richard A. A Pipeline in Peril: A Status Report on the Trans-Alaska Pipeline. Ester, Alaska; Alaska Forum for Environmental Responsibility, 1996.
- Hanrahan, John and Gruenstein, Peter. Lost Frontier: The Marketing of Alaska. New York; W.W. Norton, 1977.
- Kruse, John A. Fairbanks Community Survey. Fairbanks; Institute of Social and Economic Research, 1976.
- LaRocca, Joe. Alaska Agonistes: The Age of Petroleum: How Big Oil Bought Alaska. Rare Books, Inc. 2003.
- Lenzner, Terry F. The Management, Planning and Construction of the Trans-Alaska Pipeline System. Washington, D.C.; Report to the Alaska Pipeline Commission.
- Manning, Harvey. Cry Crisis! Rehearsal in Alaska (A Case Study of What Government By Oil Did to Alaska and Does to the Earth). San Francisco; Friends of the Earth, 1974.
- McGinniss, Joe. Going to Extremes. New York; Alfred A. Knopf, 1980.
- McPhee, John. Coming Into the Country. New York: Farrar, Straus & Giroux, 1976.
- Miller, John R. Little Did We Know: Financing the Trans Alaska Pipeline. Cleveland: Arbordale Publishing, 2012.
- Romer, John and Elizabeth. The Seven Wonders of the World: A History of the Modern Imagination. New York; Henry Holt & Company, 1995.
- Simmons, Diane. Let the Bastards Freeze in the Dark. New York; Wyndham Books, 1980.
- Strohmeyer, John. Extreme Conditions: Big Oil and the Transformation of Alaska. New York; Simon & Schuster, 1993.
- Wolf, Donald E. Big Dams and Other Dreams: The Six Companies Story. Norman, Oklahoma. University of Oklahoma Press, 1996.
- Yergin, Daniel. The Prize: The Epic Quest for Oil, Money and Power. New York; Simon & Schuster, 1991.

=== Video ===
- Armstrong, John. Pipeline Alaska. Pelican Films, 1977.
- Davis, Mark. The American Experience: The Alaska Pipeline. PBS, Season 18, Episode 11. April 24, 2006.
- World's Toughest Fixes: Alaska Oil Pipeline. National Geographic Channel. Season 2, Episode 10. August 20, 2009.
