= Moses C. Shelesnyak =

American reproductive biologist (1909–1994)

- Born: Moses Chiam Shelesnyak; June 6, 1909; Chicago, Illinois, U.S.
- Died: September 12, 1994 (aged 85); Solvang, California, U.S.
- Education: University of Wisconsin; Columbia University
- Spouse: Rosalyn Shelesnyak
- Scientific career
- Fields: Reproductive biology
- Workplaces: Weizmann Institute of Science; Smithsonian Institution

Moses Chiam Shelesnyak (June 6, 1909 – September 12, 1994) was an American reproductive biologist. He received his B.A. at University of Wisconsin and Ph.D. in anatomy at Columbia University with a dissertation on the effects of pituitary hormone treatment on the uterus of the prepubertal rat and demonstration the synergistic interactions of estrogen with progesterone in preparing the uterus for pregnancy. Then he became the director of the Washington office of the Naval Arctic Research Laboratory. In 1950, he join Weizmann Institute of Science in Israel and founded Institute's Department of Biodynamics, now called the Department of Hormone Research. In 1968, he returned to the United States become a member in Smithsonian Institution until 1977. In 1994, he was found murdered in his home.
