= Max C. Brewer =

American scientist (1924–2012)

Max Clifton Brewer
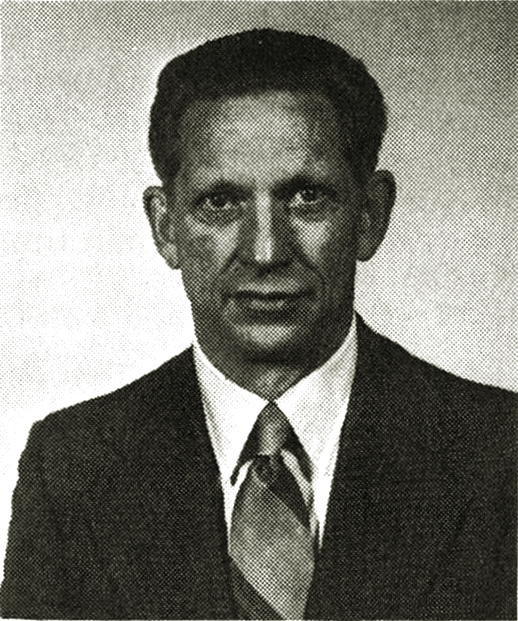
- Born: 1924; Blackfalds, Alberta, Canada
- Died: 2012 (aged 87–88)
- Education: Washington University in St. Louis
- Scientific career
- Fields: Geophysics
- Workplaces: University of Alaska Fairbanks

Max Clifton Brewer (1924–2012) was an Arctic scientist, geophysicist, geological engineer, environmentalist, educator, and philosopher, and is best known for his expertise in the scientific field of permafrost. He was the longest-serving director (1956-1971) of the Naval Arctic Research Laboratory (NARL) in Utqiaġvik, Alaska (formerly known as Barrow) where he established and managed the NARL ice stations in the Arctic Ocean. From 1971-1974 he served in the gubernatorial cabinet of William A. Egan as the first commissioner of the Alaska Department of Environmental Conservation.

Max Brewer worked alongside John F. Schindler and a number of Iñupiaq naturalist in NARL’s program on ice science. He often credited a number of Iñupiat scientists such as Jacob Stalker, Kenneth Utuayuk Toovak, Pete Sovalik, and Harry Brower Sr., as his greatest teachers, and he relied heavily on traditional Iñupiat knowledge of the Arctic and the ice to assist NARL scientific projects. Brewer appeared before the Senate Subcommittee Hearings on Native Land Claims, Anchorage, Alaska, and gave a statement in support of protecting the Iñupiat people’s rights over their own land assets.

== Biography ==
Born in Blackfalds, Alberta, Canada, in 1924, Max Brewer grew up in Alberta and in Washington state. He served during World War II in the United States Army Air Force from October 1942 until his honorable discharge in April 1944. Brewer first moved to Alaska in 1948 to work with the USGS researching the "electrical restitivity of permafrost." In 1950, he received a bachelor’s degree in geological engineering from Washington University in St. Louis, Missouri. in 1956 he married an Utqiaġvik-based and Seattle-born nurse, Marylou Cunningham and became the youngest director of NARL. In 1965 he received an honorary doctorate of science from the University of Alaska for his work in the Alaskan Arctic. Brewer died in 2012 at the age of 88 and is buried in Utqiaġvik.

== Works ==
- “Some Results of Geothermal Investigations of Permafrost in Northern Alaska,” Transactions, American Geophysical Union, Vol. 39, No. 1, February 1958.
- “The Thermal Regime of an Arctic Lake,” Transactions, American Geophysical Union, Vol. 39, No. 2, April 1958.
- “Drifting [Ice] Stations in the Arctic Ocean,” presented at the Arctic Basin Symposium, Hershey, Pennsylvania, October 1962, Arctic Institute of North America, Proceedings of the Arctic Basis Symposium October 1962, June 1963.
- “New Applications of Old Concepts of Drifting Station Operations,” Arctic Drifting Stations, The Arctic Institute of North America, 1968.
- “The Soviet Drifting Ice Station, NORTH-67,” ARCTIC, Journal of the Arctic Institute of North America, Volume 20, Number 4, December 1967.
- Transcript of “Permafrost – Its Conservation, Destruction, and Use in Arctic Alaska,” presented at the dedication to the new Naval Arctic Research Laboratory, April 1969.
- “Permafrost, Its Impact on Development,” Man’s Impact on Arctic and Subarctic Environment, Arctic Institute of North America, June 1974.
- “Arctic Research: For What Purpose and For What End?” Arctic Institute of North America Technical Paper No. 25, Alaskan Arctic Tundra,” September 1973.
- “An Environmental Analysis of the Mackenzie Valley Pipeline Research Limited Report Entitled ‘Arctic Oil Pipeline Feasibility Study 1972’,” May 4, 1973. presented on the U.S. Congressional Record by U.S. Senator Mike Gravel on May 29, 1973.
- “Alaska Department of Environmental Conservation,” University of Alaska, March 1975.
- “Alaska’s Environmental Standards,” University of Alaska, March 1975.
- “Review of Draft Environmental Impact Statement Outer Continental Shelf, DES 74-90 Released October 18, 1974,” November 29, 1974.
- “An Analysis of the Problem of Oil Spills Associated with Construction of the Trans-Alaska Oil Pipeline,” July 17, 1975.
- “Land Commitments in Alaska,” Arctic, Journal of the Arctic Institute of North America, December 1975, printed in the Fairbanks Daily News-Miner, August 24, 1976.
- Jin Huijun, & Brewer. "Experiences and lessons learned in engineering design and construction in the Alaskan Arctic." Bingchuan Dongtu - Journal of Glaciology and Geocryology, 2005, Vol.27(1), pp. 140–146.
- Jin Huijun et al. "Great challenges of, and innovative solutions to, the unstable permafrost in Central (High) Asia under a warming climate; a summary report from the First Asian conference on Permafrost." Bingchuan Dongtu - Journal of Glaciology and Geocryology, 2006, Vol.28(6), pp. 838–843.
- Jin Huijun, & Brewer. "Warming but not thawing of the cold permafrost in northern Alaska during the past 50 years." Sciences in Cold and Arid Regions, 2009, Issue 01, pp. 1–13.
