= FMC =

FMC may refer to:

== Places ==
=== Facilities ===
- Five Mile Airport (formerly: Five Mile Camp Airport), in Alaska, United States
- Magdeburg–Cochstedt Airport (German: Flughafen Magdeburg-Cochstedt), in Germany

== Government and politics ==
- Federal Magistrates Court, in Australia
- Federal Maritime Commission, a regulatory agency of the United States federal government
- Federal Medical Center, part of the United States Bureau of Prisons
- Federation of Cuban Women (Spanish: Federación de Mujeres Cubanas), part of the Communist Party of Cuba
- Forward Markets Commission, part of the Indian Ministry of Finance
- Force Mobile Command, a former name of the Canadian Army

== Industry ==
- Fairbanks, Morse and Company, a former American heavy industry
- FMC Corporation, an American chemical manufacturing company
- FMC Dockyard, Bangladeshi shipbuilding company
- FMC Technologies, an American machinery and oil services technology company
- Ford Motor Company, an American automotive manufacturer
- Future Mobility Corporation, a Chinese automotive manufacturer
- Farda Motors, an Iranian automobile manufacturer

== Media ==
- Fair Media Council, an American media advocacy organization
- Family Movie Channel, in Australia
- Fox Movie Channel, in the United States
- Family Movie Classics, in the United States
- Full Metal Challenge, a British television program

== Medicine ==
- Fludarabine-Mitoxantrone-Cyclophosphamide chemotherapy, a variation of FCM (chemotherapy)
- Faridpur Medical College, in Bangladesh
- Federal Medical Centres, in Nigeria
- Flinders Medical Centre, in Adelaide, South Australia
- Foothills Medical Centre, in Calgary, Alberta, Canada
- Fresenius Medical Care, a German medical supply company
- Frontier Medical College, in Pakistan

== Music ==
- FMC Music, a Malaysian music company.
- Fabulous Marching Cavaliers, a marching band in Virginia Beach, Virginia

== Sport ==
- Fewest moves challenge, a special discipline at speedcubing competition
- Full Members' Cup, a defunct English football competition
- Monegasque Cycling Federation (French: Fédération Monégasque de Cyclisme)
- Mexican Cycling Federation (Spanish: Federacion Mexicana de Ciclismo)

== Science and technology ==
- Fixed–mobile convergence
- Flexible metallic conduit
- Flight management computer
- Fluoromethcathinone
- FPGA Mezzanine Card
- Fundamental modeling concepts
- Flash memory controller

== Other companies ==
- Fellows Morton & Clayton, a defunct British canal transportation company
- First Manhattan Co., an American financial services company
- Fraser Milner Casgrain a Canadian law firm

== Other organizations ==
- Federated Mountain Clubs of New Zealand, an environmental protection organization
- Friday Morning Club, a defunct American women's organization
- Future of Music Coalition, an American music education and research organization
- Magna Carta (Italy) (Italian: Fondazione Magna Carta), an Italian think tank

== Other uses ==
- 15-minute city
- Free Methodist Church
- Franklin & Marshall College
