= FMCS =

FMCS may refer to:

- Framwellgate School Durham, formerly known as the Framwellgate Moor Comprehensive School
- Federal Mediation and Conciliation Service (Canada)
- Federal Mediation and Conciliation Service (United States)
- Formula Masters China
- Fourze Module Change Series, a toy line of Astroswitch Modules used in Kamen Rider Fourze
- Foreign Military Construction Sales

== See also ==
- FMC (disambiguation)
