= List of Armenian records in track cycling =

The following are the national records in track cycling in Armenia maintained by the Armenian Cycling Federation.

== Men ==
Event	Record	Athlete	Date	Meet	Place	Ref
Flying 200 m time trial						
250 m time trial (standing start)						
Team sprint						
1 km time trial						
1 km time trial (sea level)						
4000m individual pursuit	4:26.923	Edgar Stepanyan	21 October 2017	European Championships	Berlin, Germany	
4000m team pursuit						

== Women ==
Event	Record	Athlete	Date	Meet	Place	Ref
Flying 200 m time trial						
500 m time trial						
3000m individual pursuit						
3000m team pursuit						
