= Alasdair MacLennan =

Scottish cyclist

Secretary General of the Union Européenne de Cyclisme
- Incumbent
- Assumed office 6 March 2021
- Preceded by: Enrico Della Casa

President of Scottish Cycling
- In office 28 November 2009 – 25 November 2017
- Preceded by: Jock Shaw
- Succeeded by: Tom Bishop

Personal details
- Born: 1957 (age 68–69) Forres, Scotland

Alasdair MacLennan (born Forres, 1957) is a Scottish cyclist, sporting administrator and the Secretary General of the Union Européenne de Cyclisme (UEC). He was previously President of Scottish Cycling, director of British Cycling, and National Team Director for the Federation of Irish Cyclists.

== Management career ==
MacLennan was appointed National Team Director for the Federation of Irish Cyclists in 1989, succeeding future UCI President Pat McQuaid. He led Irish cycling teams to Olympic Games in Barcelona in 1992, and Atlanta in 1996, as well as UCI World Championships throughout his period in post. In 1992, he managed Conor Henry, the only Irish rider to win the Milk Race in 1992.

MacLennan retired from full-time management in 1997. Nonetheless, he led Scotland's cyclists at Commonwealth Games in Manchester in 2002, Melbourne in 2006, Delhi in 2010, and Glasgow in 2014. MacLennan's period managing Scotland's Commonwealth Games teams was one of success, including gold medals for Chris Hoy, Ross Edgar, Craig MacLean, David Millar, and Neil Fachie.

== Governing bodies ==
MacLennan was elected a director of Scottish Cycling in 2007. He was elected President in 2009 and re-elected in 2013. In 2019, he was awarded the Scottish Cycling Badge of Honour. MacLennan was also a director of British Cycling from 2012 until 2018.

Following David Lappartient's election as President of the UCI in 2018, MacLennan was elected to fill the vacancy on the management committee of the European Cycling Union. In 2021, MacLennan was elected Secretary General.
