= John F. Schindler =

American botanist (1931–2014)

John F. Schindler (1931–2014) was a botanist with a bachelor's and a master's degree from Michigan State University.

Schindler was the Assistant Director at the Naval Arctic Research Laboratory (NARL) from 1960 to 1971, under Max C. Brewer, and then took over as the Director from 1971 to 1974. Schindler was also a prolific photographic documentarian of life and the people at NARL.

== Works ==
- "The Impact of Ice Islands – The Story of ARLIS II and Fletcher's Ice Island, T-3, Since 1962," presented in Arctic Drifting Stations: A Report on Activities Supported by the Office of Naval Research, Proceedings of the Symposium held at Airlie Conference Center, Warrenton, Virginia, 12–15 April 1966 under the auspices of The Arctic Institute of North America and the Office of Naval Research, U.S. Navy, published November 1968.
- "Arctic Ecology: A Decade of Experience," UMR Journal—V. H. McNutt Colloquium Series: Vol. 2, Article 3. 1971.
- "25 Years in Support of Arctic Research: The Naval Arctic Research Laboratory at Point Barrow, Alaska," June, 1972.
- "NARL's Contribution and a Look Ahead," presented in Alaskan Arctic Tundra, Arctic Institute of North America Technical Paper No. 25, pp. 217–220, September 1973.
- "Early Arctic Exploration and Flights," presented in Arctic Flying, The Office of Naval Research Arctic Programs, pp. 11–25, 1979.
- "The Story of the Naval Arctic Research Laboratory (NARL) Aircraft Operations," presented in Arctic Flying, The Office of Naval Research Arctic Programs, pp. 11–25, 1979.
- "History of exploration in the National Petroleum Reserve in Alaska, with emphasis on the period from 1975 to 1982," presented in Geology and Exploration of the National Petroleum Reserve in Alaska, 1974 to 1982, U.S. Geological Survey Professional Paper 1399, pp. 13–76, 1988.
- "Naval Petroleum Reserve No. 4 and the beginnings of the Arctic Research Laboratory (ARL)" in Fifty More Years Below Zero. Calgary, Alberta: Arctic Institute of North America: 29–31, 2001.
