= Liechtenstein Cycling Federation =

National governing body of cycle racing in Liechtenstein

LRV logo

The Liechtenstein Cycling Federation or LRV (in German: Liechtensteiner Radfahrerverband) is the national governing body of cycle racing in Liechtenstein.

The LRV is a member of the UCI and the UEC.
