= Five Mile Airport =

Five Mile Airport Five Mile Camp Airport
- IATA: none; ICAO: PAFV; FAA LID: FVM

Summary
- Airport type: Private
- Owner: BLM - Pipeline Office
- Operator: Alyeska Pipeline Co.
- Location: Five Mile, Alaska
- Elevation AMSL: 510 ft (160 m)
- Coordinates: 65°55′37″N 149°50′24″W

Map
- Location of airport in Alaska

Runways
Direction	Length		Surface
Direction	ft	m	Surface
11/29	2,700	823	Gravel

Statistics (1994)
- Aircraft operations: 200
- Source: Federal Aviation Administration

Five Mile Airport (ICAO: PAFV, FAA LID: FVM) is a private-use airport located in Five Mile (or Five Mile Camp) in the U.S. state of Alaska. The airport is owned by the United States Bureau of Land Management (BLM) - Pipeline Office and managed by the Alyeska Pipeline Company. It is also known as Five Mile Camp Airport.

== Facilities and aircraft ==
Five Mile Airport has one runway designated 11/29 with a gravel surface measuring 2,700 by 75 feet (823 x 23 m). For the 12-month period ending August 30, 1994, the airport had 200 general aviation aircraft operations, an average of 16 per month.
