= Andorran Cycling Federation =

National governing body of cycle racing in Andorra

- Sport: Bicycle racing
- Jurisdiction: National
- Abbreviation: FAC
- Affiliation: UCI
- Headquarters: Ordino, Andorra

Official website
- www.faciclisme.com
- (Andorra)

The Andorran Cycling Federation or FAC (in Catalan: Federació Andorrana de Ciclisme) is the national governing body of cycle racing in Andorra.

The FMC is a member of the UCI and the UEC.
