= Yerevan Velodrome =

Track cycling venue in Yerevan, Armenia

Coordinates: 40°09′25″N 44°27′46″E

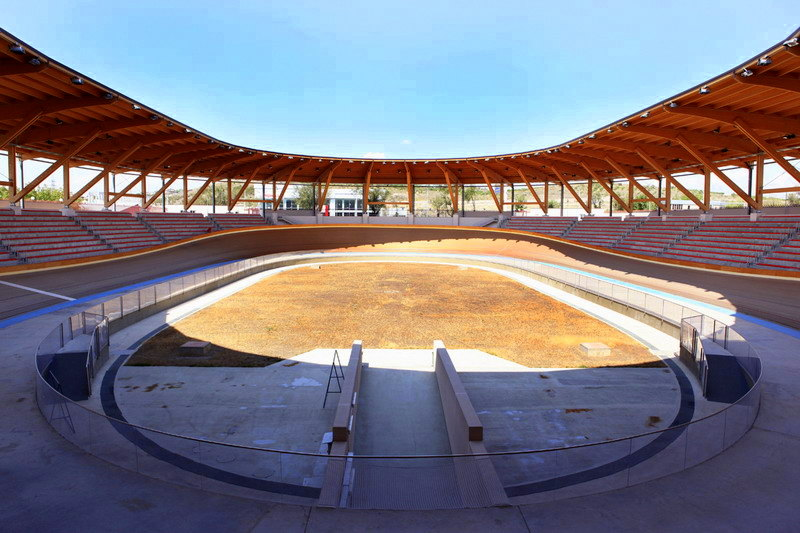
Yerevan Velodrome

Yerevan Velodrome (Armenian: Երևանի հեծանվահրապարակ), is an outdoor velodrome or track cycling venue in Yerevan, Armenia.

== About ==
Located on Admiral Isakov Avenue and owned by the municipality of Yerevan, the 250-metre (820 ft) long track is able to host international events. The velodrome has a capacity of 650 seats with lamellated wood roof and covers a total area of 3,200 square metres (34,000 sq ft). It was built to replace the old cycling track which was later demolished in 2012.

The construction of the venue began in June 2010 and completed in September 2011. It was officially opened on 15 September 2011 with the presence of the Armenian president Serzh Sargsyan.

The velodrome has a parking lot with a capacity of 240 cars.

The Armenian Cycling Federation headquarters is located on the premises of the velodrome.

== Gallery ==
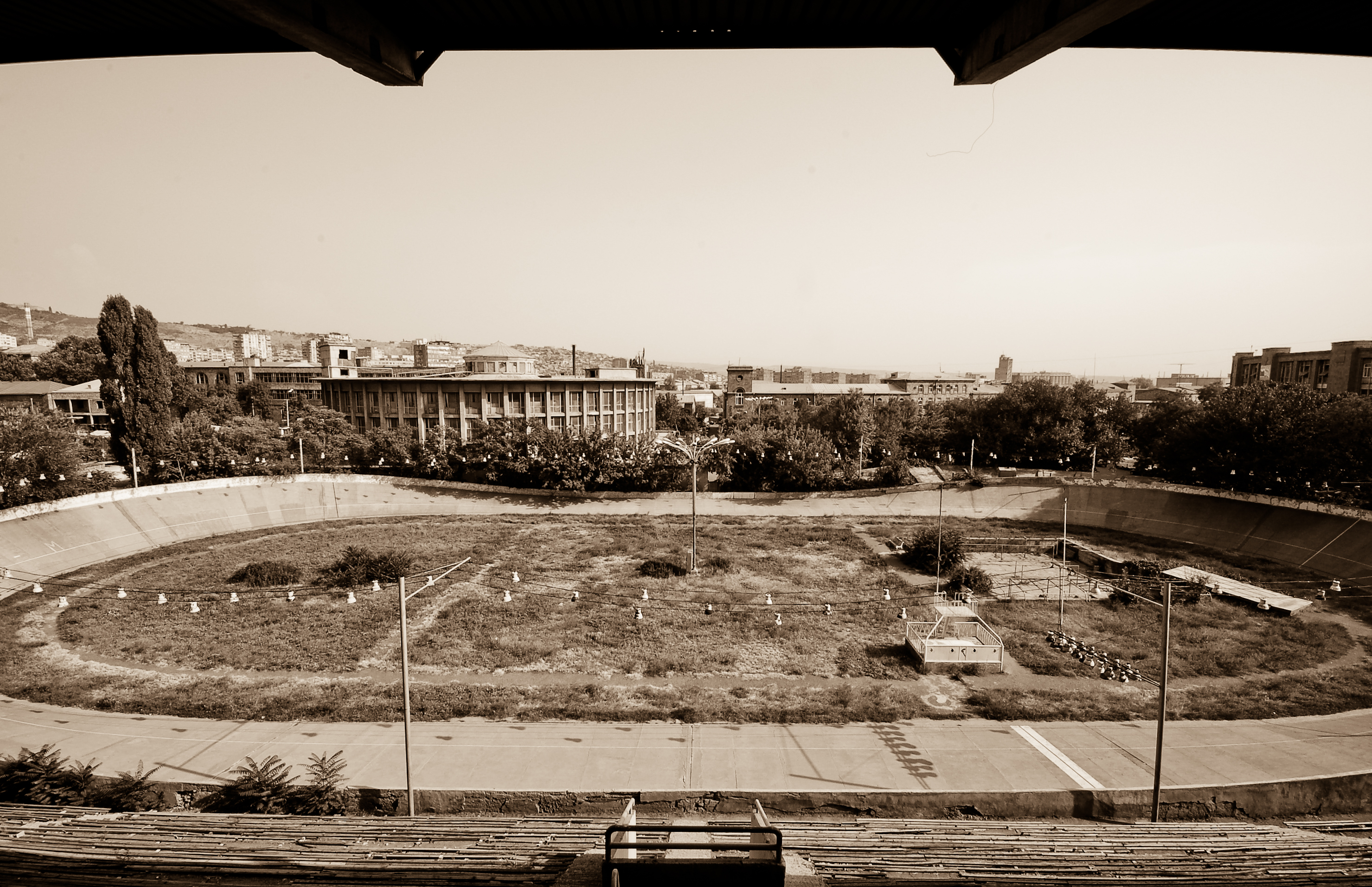
The old velodrome in 2008, before being demolished in 2012

== See also ==
- List of cycling tracks and velodromes
