= Union Européenne de Cyclisme =

European confederation of national cycling bodies

- European Cycling Union (UEC)
- UEC logo
- Sport: Cycling
- Membership: 51 Federations
- Founded: 7 April 1990
- Regional affiliation: Europe
- Headquarters: Lausanne
- Location: Switzerland
- President: Enrico Della Casa
- CEO: Alasdair MacLennan (Secretary General)
- Vice president(s): Henrik Jensen; Delmino Pereira

The Union Européenne de Cyclisme (abbreviation: UEC, English: European Cycling Union) is the European confederation of national cycling bodies; the national federations of the Union Cycliste Internationale form confederations by continent. It is headquartered in Lausanne.

In reaction to the 2022 Russian invasion of Ukraine, the UEC announced that Russia and Belarus officials will not be able to officiate at any UEC event, or attend or take part in any UEC meeting, committee, or forum.

== European Cycling Championships ==
The federation organizes all the European Cycling Championships (such as the European Road Championships and the European Track Championships) for all cycling disciplines, including road cycling, track cycling, cyclo-cross, BMX, mountain biking and indoor cycling and awards the UEC European Champion jersey to the European Champions.

In 2018, as part of the multi-sport European Championships, the UEC brought its four main European championships - track, road, mountain bike and BMX - together for the first time as the 2018 European Cycling Championships.

== Summary of events ==
- UEC European Paracycling Championships
- UCI Europe Tour
- European Road Championships
- UEC European Track Championships
- UEC European Track Championships (under-23 & junior)
- UEC European Cyclo-cross Championships
- European Mountain Bike Championships
- European Gravel Championships
- European BMX Championships
- European Indoor Cycling Championships (Artistic and Cycleball)
- European Junior Indoor Cycling Championships (Artistic and Cycleball)
- European Masters Cycling Championships
- European Para Cycling Cup
- UEC Gravel European Championships

== Member Federations ==
As of 2025, the UEC counts 51 member federations and one associated federation, the Faroese Sersambandið fyri Súkkling og Triathlon.

Country	Federation
Albania	Albanian Cycling Federation (Federata Shqiptare e Çiklizmit)
Andorra	Andorran Cycling Federation (Federació Andorrana de Ciclisme)
Armenia	Armenian Cycling Federation (Հայաստանի հեծանվային մարզաձևերի ֆեդերացիա)
Austria	Austrian Cycling Federation (Österreichischer Radsport-Verband)
Azerbaijan	Azerbaijan Cycling Federation (Azərbaycan Velosiped İdmani Federasiyasi)
Belarus	Belarusian Cycling Federation (Белорусская федерация велосипедного спорта)
Belgium	Royal Belgian Cycling League (Royale Ligue Vélocipédique Belge / Koninklijke Belgische Wielrijdersbond)
Bosnia and Herzegovina	Cycling Federation of Bosnia and Herzegovina (Biciklistički Savez Bosne i Hercegovine)
Bulgaria	Bulgarian Cycling Federation (Българска Федерация Колоездене)
Croatia	Croatian Cycling Federation (Hrvatski Biciklistički Savez)
Cyprus	Cyprus Cycling Federation (Κυπριακη Ομοσπονδια Ποδηλασιας)
Czech Republic	Czech Cycling Federation (Český Svaz Cyklistiky)
Denmark	Danish Cycling Federation (Danmarks Cykle Union)
Estonia	Estonian Cyclists' Union (Eesti Jalgratturite Liit)
Finland	Cycling Union of Finland (Suomen Pyöräilyunioni)
France	French Cycling Federation (Fédération Française de Cyclisme)
Georgia	Georgian National Cycling Federation (საქართველოს ველოსპორტის ეროვნული ფედერაცია)
Germany	German Cycling Federation (Bund Deutscher Radfahrer)
Great Britain	British Cycling
Greece	Hellenic Cycling Federation (Ελληνικη Ομοσπονδια Ποδηλασιας)
Hungary	Hungarian Cycling Federation (Magyar Kerékpársportok Szövetsége)
Iceland	Icelandic Cycling Union (Hjólreiðasamband Íslands)
Ireland	Cycling Ireland
Israel	Israel Cycling Federation (איגוד האופניים בישראל)
Italy	Italian Cycling Federation (Federazione Ciclistica Italiana)
Kosovo	Cycling Federation of Kosovo (Federata e Çiklizmit e Kosovës)
Latvia	Latvian Cycling Federation (Latvijas Riteņbraukšanas federācija)
Liechtenstein	Liechtenstein Cycling Federation (Liechtensteiner Radfahrerverband)
Lithuania	Lithuanian Cycling Federation (Lietuvos Dviračių Sporto Federacija)
Luxembourg	Luxembourg Cycling Federation (Fédération du Sport Cycliste Luxembourgeois)
Malta	Maltese Cycling Federation
Moldova	Moldavian Cycling Federation (Federaţia de ciclism din Republica Moldova)
Monaco	Monegasque Cycling Federation (Fédération Monégasque de Cyclisme)
Montenegro	Montenegro Cycling Federation (Biciklistički Savez Crne Gore)
Netherlands	Royal Dutch Cycling Union (Koninklijke Nederlandsche Wielren Unie)
North Macedonia	Cycling Federation of Macedonia (Велосипедска Федерација на Македонија)
Norway	Norwegian Cycling Federation (Norges Cykleforbund)
Poland	Polish Cycling Federation (Polski Związek Kolarski)
Portugal	Portuguese Cycling Federation (Federação Portuguesa de Ciclismo)
Romania	Romanian Cycling Federation (Federația Română de Ciclism)
Russia	Russian Cycling Federation (Федерация велосипедного спорта России)
San Marino	San Marinese Cycling Federation (Federazione Sammarinese Ciclismo)
Serbia	Cycling Federation of Serbia (Biciklistički Savez Srbije)
Slovakia	Slovak Cycling Federation (Slovenský Zväz Cyklistiky)
Slovenia	Slovenian Cycling Federation (Kolesarska Zveza Slovenije)
Spain	Royal Spanish Cycling Federation (Real Federación Española de Ciclismo)
Sweden	Swedish Cycling Federation (Svenska Cykelförbundet)
Switzerland	Swiss Cycling
Turkey	Turkish Cycling Federation (Türkiye Bisiklet Federasyonu)
Ukraine	Ukrainian Cycling Federation (Федерація велосипедного спорту України)
Vatican City	Vatican Cycling (Ciclistica Vaticana)
