= Cycling Federation of Bosnia and Herzegovina =

Biciklistički Savez Bosne i Hercegovine
- Sport: Cycling
- Jurisdiction: Bosnia and Herzegovina
- Abbreviation: BSBiH
- Founded: 1949
- Affiliation: UCI
- Headquarters: Sarajevo
- President: Zlatko Berbić

Official website
- www.bs-bih.ba

Cycling Federation of Bosnia & Herzegovina (BSBiH) is the main national governing body for cycle sport in BiH. BSBiH is a member of the Union Cycliste Internationale (UCI) and Union Européenne de Cyclisme (UET). Founded in 1949, it is one of the oldest athletic organizations in BiH.

== See also ==
- Culture of BiH
- Balkan Elite Road Classics
