= Cyprus Cycling Federation =

National governing body of cycle racing in Cyprus

The Cyprus Cycling Federation (CCF) (Greek: Κυπριακή Ομοσπονδία Ποδηλασίας, Κ.Ο.ΠΟ) is the national governing body of cycle racing in Cyprus. The CCF is a member of the UCI and the UEC.

Logo of the CCF
