= Cycling Union of Finland =

National governing body of cycle racing in Finland

SPU logo

The Cycling Union of Finland or SPU (Finnish: Suomen Pyöräilyunioni) is the national governing body of cycle racing in Finland.

The SPU is a member of the UCI and the UEC.
