= Alyeska Pipeline Service Company =

American pipeline transport company

- Industry: Pipeline transport
- Founded: 1970
- Headquarters: Anchorage, Alaska, United States
- Website: alyeska-pipe.com

The Alyeska consortium refers to the major oil companies that own and operate the Trans-Alaska Pipeline System (TAPS) through the Alyeska Pipeline Service Company.

== History ==
The Alaska corporation commonly known as Alyeska Pipeline Company was founded in 1970 to design, construct, operate and maintain a pipeline to transport oil from the fields on the North Slope of Alaska where oil was discovered in 1968 to an ice-free deep-water port in Valdez, Alaska. The pipeline was built between March 1975 and June 1977, running from the North Slope fields at Prudhoe Bay to the Marine Terminal at Valdez on Prince William Sound. Alyeska then went on to operate and maintain TAPS. The first oil flowed into the pipeline on June 20, 1977, and the first tanker load departed from Valdez on August 1, 1977.

Totem Marine Tug & Barge, Inc. v. Alyeska Pipeline Service Co. was argued before the Alaska Supreme Court in 1978.

The Alyeska Pipeline Service Company was partially responsible for helping to respond to the Exxon Valdez oil spill. However, Alyeska Pipeline was unprepared for the events, and consequently slow to respond with cleanup crews and equipment. Additionally, shortly before the Exxon Valdez spill, Alyeska had persuaded the Coast Guard that some safety equipment was not necessary on tankers---equipment that may have reduced the scale of the Exxon Valdez disaster. September 2017 Alyeska had another spill due to a mix up of piping by long time employees, and dispensed anywhere from 9.5 to 38 barrels of product into the narrows of Valdez.

The thirty-year TAPS State and Federal land leases were due to expire in 2004. The State Lease was renewed for another thirty years on November 26, 2002, and a matching Federal Record of Decision for Right-of-Way was signed on January 8, 2003.

In 2019, it was announced that BP would be selling its shares in Alyeska to Houston-based Hilcorp.

== Organization ==
The major owner of the company is Harvest Alaska, LLC with 49.1069%. The other owner members are ConocoPhillips Transportation at 29.6102% and ExxonMobil Pipeline Co. at 21.2829%. The government responsibility in regulating TAPS is managed through the Joint Pipeline Office (, JPO), a consortium of thirteen federal and state agencies under the Department of the Interior.

The corporation is named after an Aleut word meaning "mainland". It is headquartered in Anchorage and has around 700 employees.
