= Kenneth Utuayuk Toovak =

Iñupiaq naturalist (1923–2009)

Kenneth Utuayak Toovak (1923–2009) (last name pronounced Tuvaaq in Iñupiaq) was an Iñupiaq naturalist and scientist with an expertise on sea ice and ice dynamics. Toovak was born in Utqiaġvik and worked with the Naval Arctic Research Laboratory (NARL) for many years and oversaw a number of rescue missions. In 2003 Toovak was awarded an honorary doctorate from the University of Alaska, Fairbanks.
