= Armenian Cycling Federation =

National governing body of cycle racing in Armenia

- Sport: Bicycle racing
- Jurisdiction: National
- Affiliation: UCI
- Headquarters: Yerevan
- (Armenia)

The Armenian Cycling Federation (Armenian: Հայաստանի հեծանվային մարզաձևերի ֆեդերացիա) is the national governing body of cycle racing in Armenia. It is a member of the International Cycling Union and the European Cycling Union.

The federation operates the Yerevan Velodrome, where its headquarters are located. Armenian track cyclist Edgar Stepanyan competed successfully at the 2015 and 2018 European Track Championships, where he won two gold medals at the junior and under-23 level.

== See also ==
- Sport in Armenia
