= Monégasque Cycling Federation =

National governing body of cycle racing in Monaco

Monegasque Cycling Federation
- Sport: Bicycle racing
- Jurisdiction: National
- Abbreviation: FMC
- Founded: 1985
- Affiliation: UCI
- Headquarters: Fontvieille, Monaco

Official website
- www.ucmonaco.com
- (Monaco)

The Monegasque Cycling Federation or FMC (in French: Fédération Monégasque de Cyclisme) is the national governing body of cycle racing in Monaco.

The FMC is a member of the UCI and the UEC.
