= Naval Arctic Research Laboratory =

Coordinates: 71°19′30″N 156°40′50″W

The Naval Arctic Research Laboratory (NARL) was an Office of Naval Research research facility located at Point Barrow in Utqiaġvik, Alaska. The site is the present day location of Iḷisaġvik College.
