= Richardson Highway =

Highway in Alaska, United States

Richardson Highway
- Richardson Highway highlighted in red

Route information
- Length: 368 mi (592 km)
- Component highways: AK-4 from Valdez to Delta Junction; AK-2 from Delta Junction to Fairbanks; AK-1 from Glennallen to Gakona Junction

Major junctions
- South end: Alaska Marine Highway in Valdez
- AK-10 (Edgerton Highway) in Willow Creek; AK-1 (Glenn Highway / Tok Cut-Off) in Glennallen; AK-8 (Denali Highway) in Paxson; AK-2 (Alaska Highway) in Delta Junction
- North end: AK-2 (Steese Expressway) / Airport Way in Fairbanks

Location
- Country: United States
- State: Alaska

Highway system
- Alaska Routes; Interstate; Scenic Byways
← AK-3	→ AK-5

The Richardson Highway is a highway in the U.S. state of Alaska, running 368 miles (562 km) and connecting Valdez to Fairbanks. It is marked as Alaska Route 4 from Valdez to Delta Junction and as Alaska Route 2 from there to Fairbanks. It also connects segments of Alaska Route 1 between the Glenn Highway and the Tok Cut-Off. The Richardson Highway was the first major road built in Alaska.

== History ==
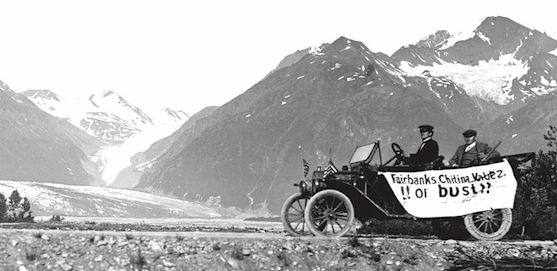
The "first car" to travel from Fairbanks to Valdez, 1913.

=== Early Years and Exploration ===
Indigenous trade routes existed in the region going from Prince William Sound to the north of the Alaska Range into the Alaskan Interior starting at least 5000 years ago. The majority of the trade was facilitated by the Ahtna, but also included the Eyak and Sugpiaq to the south, and the Tanana Athabaskans to the north. The route of the Richardson Highway primarily follows part of this old trade network. Prospectors heard rumors of this ancient trade route and it encouraged them to explore the Interior to try to find a route to the gold fields in the Klondike area.

In 1885, Lieutenant Henry Allen's party crossed the eastern Alaska Range from the mouth of the Copper River to the Tanana River via Suslota Pass, the first non-natives to do so. In his report, he noted that it would be possible to build a road between Prince William Sound to the Yukon River. Shortly after his expedition, gold discoveries in the late 1880s to mid 1890s north of the Alaska Range, such as in the Fortymile Mining District, at Birch Creek near Circle, and in the western Yukon, put pressure on the US Congress to explore Alaska. In March of 1898, the US Department of War funded three expeditions to explore Southcentral Alaska. Edwin Glenn led the expedition ordered to explore from Prince William Sound to Cook Inlet for routes between the Susitna and Copper rivers then northward to the Tanana River. Attached to the expedition was geologist Walter Mendenhall from the USGS. They would eventually cross Isabel Pass, who were also the first recorded non-natives through that route, but fell short 15-20 miles from the Tanana River. This pass received very little attention at the time.

=== Valdez-Eagle Trail ===
Concurrently, Captain William Abercrombie was ordered to explore from Valdez northward to the Copper River and tributaries of the Tanana River. By 1899, the Army ordered Captain Abercrombie to build a military road from Valdez to Copper Center then onto Eagle. Before winter of 1899, they had completed a 93 mile trail suitable for packhorses through Keystone Canyon and past Thompson Pass to the Tonsina River. By 1901, the pack trail was completed, and provided an "all-American" route to the Klondike gold fields. The total distance of the road was about 409 miles (660 km). After the rush ended, the Army kept the trail open in order to connect its posts for communication at Fort Liscum, in Valdez, and Fort Egbert, in Eagle. One way message times were generally around 6 months from the Yukon to Washington, D.C. By 1904, the completion of the WAMCATS allowed near instantaneous communication from Fort Egbert to the US Capitol using an all American telegraph system.

=== Valdez-Fairbanks Trail ===
The Fairbanks Gold Rush in July of 1902 drew attention away from the Klondike region, drawing prospectors to Fairbanks. These new travelers would follow the established Valdez-Eagle Trail until the Gakona River, and then utilize Ahtna trading trails through Isabel Pass to the Tanana Valley and finally unto Fairbanks. Most traffic using this route was during the winter with pack trains or sled dogs, since animals would tear up moss if it wasn't frozen, hampering travel. Travel to the area during the summer was via riverboats. The new traffic also enticed many to build roadhouses along the route, although many faced difficulty keeping them profitable.

Along with the previous gold discoveries, the Fairbanks Gold Rush prompted the US Congress to send a senatorial party in 1903 to Alaska to hear testimony. At Eagle, Lieutenant William Mitchell told the party his estimated $2 million cost of building a road between Eagle to the Tanana River crossing, near Tok, then onto the Chena River confluence with the Tanana River. He suggested a route from Copper Center to the Tanana River crossing would be more cost effective. The senatorial party also met with Judge James Wickersham and Fairbanks resident Abraham Spring, both pushing for government led roadbuilding, opining that the miners could build feeder roads if a central road was built.

=== Road Building ===
In early 1904, Congress passed legislation to build roads throughout Alaska. After surveys by the Army Corps of Engineers during the summer of that year, President Theodore Roosevelt appointed Major Wilds Richardson as the head of the Alaska Road Commission to supervise the construction of a wagon road from Valdez to Fairbanks starting in 1905. Richardson suggested dividing the trail into 3 sections, the first from Valdez to Copper Center along Abercrombie's route, the second from the mouth of the Delta River to Fairbanks, and the third connecting the two from Copper Center to Isabel Pass. During the construction, the government hired failed gold prospectors as well as regular construction workers. The income from this work allowed many of the prospectors to leave Alaska.

There were two routes on the north side of Isabel Pass near Donnelly's Roadhouse for the summer and winter seasons. The winter route took advantage of frozen ground but it was unsuitable for summer travel due to shifting rivers. The summer route was built on solid ground near Donnelly Dome northward. The first winter route was short lived when built in 1905, and a better route was found in 1907. The winter route, dubbed the "Delta Winter Cutoff," was used until around 1921 when the Alaska Road Commission no longer maintained it.

By 1909, eggs, cranberries, cattle, and other groceries were shipped up the trail in the winter to Fairbanks. Although Richardson contended with low funds and difficult construction, the road was finished in 1910.

Although automobiles and motorcycles were shipped to Fairbanks and Valdez sometime after 1908, it is unknown when the first motorized vehicle was used on the highway. By 1909, cars were used at either end of the highway. Attempts were made in 1909 to use a motorcycle to cross the entirety of the highway, but storms and mechanical issues proved too much. On July 29th, 1913, Bobby Sheldon and two prospectors, John Ronan and John Ferguson, began the trip from Fairbanks at approximately 10:30pm in a modified Model T. They arrived at Valdez four days later, at around 11pm on August 2nd, after taking a detour to Chitina. A second vehicle made by the White Motor Company from the Alaska Road Commission with representatives manufacturer left the day before Bobby Sheldon's party, and arrived in Fairbanks on August 6th.

The rise of motorized travel led the road to be officially upgraded to automobile standards in 1923. To finance continued maintenance and road construction, the Alaska Road Commission instituted tolls for commercial vehicles in 1933 of up to $175 per trip, which were collected at the Tanana River ferry crossing at Big Delta. When the tolls were further increased in 1941 to boost business for the Alaska Railroad, disgruntled truckers nicknamed "gypsies" started a rogue ferry service in order to evade the toll.

The Alaska and Glenn highways, built during World War II, connected the rest of the continent and Anchorage to the Richardson Highway at Delta Junction and Glennallen, respectively. This allowed motor access to the new military bases built in the Territory just prior to the war: Fort Richardson in Anchorage, and Fort Wainwright adjacent to Fairbanks. The bridge at Big Delta, the last remaining gap, was built as part of the Alaska Highway project.

=== Modernity ===
The southern end was only open during summers until 1950, when a freight company foreman who lived near the treacherous Thompson Pass plowed the snow himself for an entire season to prove the route could be used year-round. The highway was paved in 1957.

The Trans-Alaska Pipeline System, built in 1973-1977, mostly parallels the highway from Fairbanks to Valdez.

Several sections of the highway are designated as Alaska State Scenic Byways. On January 20, 1998, the section from Valdez to Glennallen was given this designation. Another designation was the first section of the northern Richardson Highway from Fort Greely at Mile 261 to Fairbanks on December 23, 2004. This was further expanded south to Black Rapids Roadhouse on September 18, 2008.

== Roadhouses ==
Due to the rugged nature of the early highway, roadhouses were built every 15-20 miles. These ranged from a tents on platforms to properly built cabins with separated rooms. Most were heated by woodstoves and sourced water from nearby lakes or streams. Food ranged from bleak to scrumptious, depending on nearby game availability and gardens at each outpost. Hay and water for horses were also provided. Around 30 roadhouses existed at one time, but this would change each year as they route of the highway changed and business would open and close.

As the quality of the road increased and therefore the distance traveled in a day, the number of open roadhouses decreased. When the automobile was introduced, travel became even faster, further decreasing the number of open roadhouses. By the 1920s, many roadhouses were used for other activities, such as hunting or were tourist focused.

Roadhouses of the Richardson Highway
Name(s)	Distance	Reference Point	Description	Citation
Camp Comfort	Mile 10	Valdez	One of the first roadhouses in operation during Captain Abercrombie's expedition in 1898. In 1902, it was a two-story spruce log cabin. It closed in 1918.	
Second Class Roadhouse	Mile 13	Valdez	First opened in the winter of 1904-1905. It was closed by August 1905.	
Wortman's Roadhouse	Mile 18.5	Valdez	Considered one of the best roadhouses, it was located after Keystone Canyon and is listed as the first roadhouse built along the route. In 1902, it was expanded with a barn for horses and doghouses. The main roadhouse was expanded but was destroyed by a fire in 1907, and was rebuilt later that year with the remains of the Wilson's Roadhouse. It closed in 1919.	
Wayside Inn, Our Roadhouse, The White House, The White Roadhouse, Wilson's Roadhouse	Mile 18.8	Valdez	A short lived roadhouse that opened in 1902, but was closed in 1907 to be used as lumber to repair Wortman's Roadhouse after the fire.	
Robert's Roadhouse	Mile 20.1	Valdez	A tent roadhouse operated by J.P. Roberts and was only in operation from spring until the fall of 1902.	
Kennedy Roadhouse	Mile 20.1	Valdez	Ran by the Kennedy Stage Service, it was built to serve its pack animals and travelers. It is unknown when this roadhouse was closed.	
Summit Roadhouse, Stone House	Mile 26	Valdez	Built in 1906 as a canvas structure, it was reinforced with nearby stones in order to survive storms in Thompson Pass. It is unknown when this roadhouse was closed.	
Eureka Roadhouse	Mile 31	Valdez	Built in 1905 by the Valdez Transportation Company, it was a two-story building with sleeping quarters and livestock feed. It burned to the ground in April 1906 and was not rebuilt.	
Ptarmigan Drop Roadhouse	Mile 32	Valdez	Opened during the winter of 1901-1902 by E.M. Marston and Mr. Masey, but it was sold to E.E. Doty at the end of 1902. She later bought Wortman's Roadhouse in 1905, and leased this roadhouse to several individuals. By 1923, it was listed as a relief cabin by the Valdez Chamber of Commerce.	
Beaver Dam Roadhouse	Mile 41	Valdez	Built by Len Thompson, it opened on June 4, 1903 on the old riverbed of the Tsaina River. It was bought out by the Valdez Transportation Company in 1905, who then sold it to Robert R. Robinson and George Treat in 1906. Reviews by travelers were mixed, with James Wickersham commenting positively on his stay in 1905, but others such as Ella Higginson called it "gloomily magnificent." It closed in 1918.	
Tiekell Roadhouse	Mile 50.8	Valdez	Located at a former settlement called Tiekel City that had been destroyed by a forest fire, it opened in 1902 with the Copper River Mining, Trading, and Development Company. It was purchased by Ed Wood in 1904, and by 1909 it was enlarged to accommodate up to 30 guests. Fred B. Vaughn purchased it in 1909 and it was in operation as a roadhouse 1930s then into the 1940s as a refreshment stop. By 1968, it was a truck stop. As of 2016, it is a private residence, although it is not near the modern route.	
Tacoma Roadhouse	Mile 57.5	Valdez	Opened in May 1907 by J. Olsen, it was quickly sold to Dick Windmiller in 1908, then T.J. Huganin in 1910. It is unknown when this roadhouse closed.	
Ernestine Roadhouse	Mile 62	Valdez	Hoping to capitalize on a junction of several trails and gold discovered nearby, Johnny Nelson and George L. Davis constructed this roadhouse in 1902. It was sold to Ed Page in 1904. A common complaint of this roadhouse was overcrowding. In 1912, it was purchased by the former cook of Ptarmigan Drop Roadhouse and experienced prospector Harry Miller. It closed sometime in the winter of 1915-1916.	
Kings Roadhouse, The Glacier Roadhouse	Mile 71	Valdez	This roadhouse opened during the winter of 1906-1907 to unknown owners. By 1910 it was operated by Mr. and Mrs. Braxton, but was closed by 1912.	
Upper Tonsina, Loomis, Donaldson Roadhouses	Mile 79	Valdez	Jim Donaldson built this roadhouse at the junction of the government trail built by William Abercrombie and the Nizina Trail, and it was operated by Bill Poeska in 1900. The Loomis Roadhouse was built nearby soon afterward and was run by Ike H. Loomis. In the winter of 1901-1902, Charles C. Yager operated the Donaldson Roadhouse. The Donaldson Roadhouse was purchased in 1902 by Jake Nafstad and Fred A. Martin who renamed the roadhouse to Tonsina Roadhouse, and enlarged the facilities to accommodate 60 guests. It closed in 1916, but was purchased by Andy Deringer in 1927. The original structure burned the following year, but was rebuilt from army surplus. As of 2016, it still stands and hosts a Solstice Festival and Super Bowl, although there are concerns of the building quality.	
Wayside Inn	Mile 89	Valdez	Opened by 1908, the exact date of start of operations for this roadhouse is unknown. It was two stories tall, and run by signwriter Paul Hansel until an unknown date.	
Willow Creek Roadhouse	Mile 90.9	Valdez	First constructed by Frank J. Bingham in 1905 as a single story log cabin, it was enlarged by 1909 to two stories and a lean-to. He also farmed hay and oats in the area. In 1915-1916, it was managed by Claud Stuart and Frank G. Bingham, who is of unclear relation to Frank J. Bingham. It was abandoned sometime after 1916.	
Hotel Holman, Blix's Roadhouse, Copper Center Roadhouse and Trading Post, Copper Center Lodge, Old Town Copper Center Inn and Restaurant	Mile 101	Valdez	First started as a series of tents in Copper Center in the July of 1898, Andrew Holman built a log hotel and trading post by the winter of 1899. In 1901, Ringwald Blix was appointed the postmaster of the first post office along the trail, and he bought the hotel in 1906. He sold it to Has Ditman in 1918, then Ditman sold it to Florence Barnes in 1923. A fire in 1932 caused damage to the building, but was quickly repaired by Barnes. After Barnes' death in 1948, it was bought by George and Katherine Ashby. The Ashby's operated it for several decades. The original building was destroyed by a fire in 2012 caused by faulty wiring. It is still in operation today renamed to Old Town Copper Center Inn and Restaurant in 2015.	
The McCrary Roadhouse, Copper Center Hotel	Mile 101.5	Valdez	This roadhouse opened in 1904 by John McCrary, but burned down in 1909. In 1910, he rebuilt it as the first frame house along the trial, and renamed it as the Copper Center Hotel. It later burned down in the winter of 1913-1914 and was not rebuilt.	
Tazlina Roadhouse	Mile 110	Valdez	Located at the mouth of the Tazlina River, this roadhouse was built in 1902 by two men, Porter and Bundy. The latter later drowned in the Tazlina River after ferrying travelers in 1903. Billy Kliske took over the roadhouse in 1906 and operated it for over 20 years. In 1927, a major flood washed out a bridge and stranded some of Kliske's livestock on the opposite side of the river. After a rescue attempt, Kliske became stranded, and was rescued by Willie Fox, but died several days later. The roadhouse disappeared from use shortly after.	
Simpson's Roadhouse, Brown's Roadhouse	Mile 111.9	Valdez	Archie S. Brown built the roadhouse in 1913 at a junction which lead to the Nelchina area, where gold had been discovered in 1912. It was operated by Brown and G.E. Simpson, and a farm was developed alongside the roadhouse. It is not known when the roadhouse closed, but the Nelchina gold rush was very short lived.	
Dry Creek Roadhouse	Mile 117.5	Valdez	Dry Creek Roadhouse was established in 1906 with a two-story log building and a large lean-to on one side. It had various owners over the years, Edwards and George B. Rorer were the builders and operators. Edwards sold his ownership to L.G. Rorer sometime before 1908. In 1910, Mr. and Mrs. J. Lawrence bought the roadhouse, but only Mrs. Lawrence operated it. It was then leased to Mr. and Mrs. Smart in 1912, but the son of the owner of Copper Center Hotel, Nelson McCrary, bought it in 1914, establishing a fox farm and trading post. Another son, John McCrary was listed as a fox breeder in 1917-1918. The roadhouse closed sometime before 1922, but it was used as a camp for the U.S. Army during World War II.	
Gulkana Roadhouse, Gulkana Trading Post and Hotel	Mile 126.9	Valdez	This roadhouse was established sometime before the winter of 1904-1905 at the junction between the Bear Creek Trail to Valdez Creek and the Valdez-Eagle Trail. In 1906, it was sold to a miner and fur trader, Charles "Buck" Levi Hoyt, from a person named Koon. Hoyt and Dolph Smith renamed it the Gulkana Trading Post and Hotel. It was a two-story building with 30 beds and 8 rooms. A lean-to was added in 1909 for a post office. Sometime later, Hoyt bought Smith's share and operated the roadhouse with his family until 1916. It was then sold to Elizabeth Griffith, whom operated it with her daughter, Anna Leak. In operation longer than the majority of other roadhouses along the highway, it was expanded in 1931, but burnt down in 1948 and not rebuilt.	
Gakona Roadhouse; Gakona Roadhouse, Mail Station and Trading Post; Doyle's Roadhouse	Mile 130.9	Valdez	Jim Doyle built this single story roadhouse in 1902 near the mouth of the Gakona River, but it was managed by the Valdez Transportation Company by the winter of 1904-1905. The company enlarged it to a two-story building with a lean-to. George Rorer managed this roadhouse before establishing the Dry Creek Roadhouse in 1906. In 1912, it was bought by Mike Johnson, then sold to J. M. Elmer in 1919. It was gradually taken over by the Slate Creek Mining Company until 1926, when it was bought by Arne Sundt. He built a new roadhouse in 1929 at the same site but stopped using the original for guests. Sundt's children and widow took over after his death in 1946. The 1929 is in operation as of 2016, while the 1905 building was listed on the National Register of Historic Places in 1977, though in poor condition.	
Chippewa Roadhouse, Gillispie's Roadhouse	Mile 160	Valdez, winter trail section	Built as an unpeeled log cabin by prospectors of the Chippewa Mining Company in 1902, it was managed by the Valdez Transportation Company in 1904. During the winter of 1905-1906, it was sold to John Gillispie, the manager of the roadhouse, and it was renamed to Gillispie's Roadhouse. It was abandoned after trail was upgraded to be all season in 1906.	
Timberline Roadhouse	Mile 192	Valdez, winter trail section	Established as a tent by Alvin J. Paxson in 1905, it was built near the timberline of a ridge that separates the Gulkana and Gakona Rivers. He later enlarged it to a 25 by 100 foot tent with bunks. It was closed after one winter after the opening of the all season route in 1906.	
Poplar Grove Roadhouse, Hamill's Roadhouse	Mile 137.8	Valdez	It is unknown when this roadhouse was built, but it was in operation by 1907 as Hammill's Roadhouse as a two-story log cabin. Hammill was likely a half owner, since in May 1907, Carl A. Swanson sold his half interest to Ben Torbell. By 1915, Richard Windmiller operated the roadhouse and did so until 1918. The roadhouse closed in the 1920s, last operated by a man named Crampton and Gabe Aspland.	
Sourdough Roadhouse and Trading Post, Pollard's Roadhouse	Mile 147.5	Valdez	This roadhouse was first listed as Pollard's Roadhouse in 1907, but it is unknown who Pollard is. Nellie Yager began managing the roadhouse in 1908, renaming it to Sourdough Roadhouse and Trading Post. She ran the roadhouse until 1922 when she sold it to her niece, Hazel Waechter. It was in operation until it burned down.	
Our Home Roadhouse, McGee's Roadhouse	Mile 160.9	Valdez	W.C. McGee, a miner, established the roadhouse in 1906 as a long log cabin, but handed over the operation to his daughter, L.M. Hicks. She renamed it Our Home Roadhouse. By 1910, Maude Birch owned the establishment, but it was turned over to Charles H. McCourt in 1915 then Gabe Aspland that same year. It is unknown when it stopped operation.	
Abbott's Roadhouse	Mile 168	Valdez	This roadhouse is of unknown provenance and unknown closure date. It is only listed in the Orr Stage Line distance table in 1910, with a meal costing $2.	
Meier's Roadhouse	Mile 170	Valdez	Charles J. Meier, a former cook for the Timberline Roadhouse, established this roadhouse and farm in 1906 near a small lake, now named Meiers Lake. A new trail from this lake was established going to Valdez Creek shortly before. He successfully grew vegetables, timothy, and redtop for both on-site usage and sale, with one season reporting three tons vegetables and $1,300 worth of hay. The original structure was destroyed in 1925, but was rebuilt, but again burned down in 1950. It is still in operation today as Meier's Lake Roadhouse, near the original roadhouse site.	
Paxson's Roadhouse	Mile 185.5	Valdez	Alvin J. Paxson built this roadhouse in 1906 a few miles away from Summit Lake to avoid the winds that come out of Isabel Pass. It was well-received by travelers and a community grew quickly around the roadhouse, which included a post office and telegraph station. It was also a junction for the trail to Valdez Creek. A few years later, Paxson sold it to Fred Nichols, who also owned Yost's Roadhouse. The main building burned to the ground in 1923, and was rebuilt several times. There was still a structure in 2008 somewhat south of the original site.	
Yost's Roadhouse, McCallum's Roadhouse	Mile 203	Valdez	First built as a single story log cabin in 1905 and operated by Mrs. McCallum, it was taken over by Charlie Yost in 1906, who operated it for four years and added a two-story cabin. In 1910, it was taken over by Mr. and Mrs. H.L. Stull. Fred Nichols operated it for a year in 1912, then it was sold to Fred Thayer, John Betz, and Nelson J. McCrary in succession. It was known to be in a treacherous part of the trail where a number of people died from exposure and were buried in a nearby graveyard. The roadhouse was flooded by winter overflow in March of 1916 was abandoned that summer.	
Casey's Cache, McKinley's	Mile 212.5	Valdez	James Casey first set up a roadhouse "of sorts" in 1901 before it was taken over by the Valdez Transportation Company. When visited by James Wickersham in early 1905, he noted that the site was just 4 tents. A permanent structure was completed in September of 1905 and it was named after President William McKinley since the company had already had a different roadhouse name after President Theodore Roosevelt. It was disused by 1910.	
Miller's Roadhouse, McDevitt's	Mile 214	Valdez	It is unknown who first built this roadhouse, which was in operation by 1906. Wilson Miller operated the roadhouse between 1904 and 1910, but conflicting newspaper articles state that a McDevitt also operated it during this time. After 1910, it was operated by John C. Bowman until World War I. Regardless of ownership, it was well received by travelers until 1923, where it fell into disuse for years before burning down.	
Rapids Roadhouse	Mile 227.4	Valdez	Started as a tent during the winter of 1902-1903, a two-story log building was built by Peter Findler soon afterward. Findler owned the roadhouse until his death in 1909. Single story additions were built as needed. By 1922, there was enough room for twenty three travelers. The roadhouse still exists to this day and listed on the National List of Historic Places.	
Nigger Bill's, Butche's	Mile 227.4-275.3	Valdez	The exact location of this roadhouse cabin is unknown. It was in operation from 1903 to 1906 at the latest.	
Colgrove Roadhouse	Mile 227.4-275.3	Valdez	The exact location of this roadhouse is unknown. It was in operation from 1904 to 1905 at the latest.	
Bradley's Roadhouse	Mile 227.4-275.3	Valdez	The exact location of this roadhouse is unknown. It was in operation from 1904 to 1905 at the latest.	
Donnelly's Roadhouse	Mile 238	Valdez	First built in 1906 by Donnelly and R.E. Shanklin, it became one of the most liked roadhouses on the route by 1910. James Geoghegan became the owner in 1910 for three years until he sold it Mr. and Mrs. Thomas J. Flannigan. It was flooded by the Delta River the following year, but it was rebuilt. However, it was permanently destroyed by another flood in 1926.	
Tingley's Roadhouse	Mile 6	Donnelly's	The roadhouse was operated for one year on the old Delta Winter Cutoff by J. Alias and Brydone E. Tingley in 1906.	
Gordon's Roadhouse	Mile 16	Donnelly's	Mr. and Mrs. H.E. Gordon opened at operated the roadhouse starting in the winter of 1907-1908 until 1918. Henry Stock was then the owner until 1921 when the Delta Winter Cutoff was no longer used. He then used the roadhouse as his home	
Sullivan's Roadhouse	Mile 32	Donnelly's	First built by John Sullivan in 1906 along the old Delta Winter Cutoff, he rebuilt it along the new route in 1907. Unusual for the time, the new building had a metal roof. It was a popular and well received roadhouse until it closed in 1921 due to declining demand from competition with the Alaska Railroad. It was also where James Geoghegan worked before his purchase of Donnelly's.	
Spruce Creek, Tent Roadhouse	Mile 43	Donnelly's	Originally built by James Geoghegan after being asked to by Sullivan, it consisted of three tents. It was disused by 1910.	
Shroeder's Roadhouse, The Washburn House	Mile 56	Donnelly's	Little is known about the Shroeder's Roadhouse, but it was in operation by 1907. Two years later, the Washburn House in a similar location operated by Carrie Stoner. It burned to the ground in 1910.	
The Martin Roadhouse	Mile 56	Donnelly's	Another roadhouse nearby the previous was advertising in 1908. It was disused by 1921, throughout its existence was all under the same operator William A. Martin.	
Beal's Cache	Mile 257	Valdez	It is unknown who started this roadhouse near Donnelly Dome. It was operated by Charley Miller in 1915 until about 1919. He sold it to John Hajdukovich. By 1928, it was abandoned.	
Rika's Roadhouse, Bennett's Roadhouse, McCarty's, Big Delta Roadhouse	Mile 275	Valdez	Benjamin Bennett built this roadhouse in 1904 near the mouth of the Delta River where it meets the Tanana, although E.T. Barnette owned the supplies sold here. Dan G. McCarty purchased the entire property in 1905 and sold it in 1910 to Hajdukovich, but the name was kept. By this time, it was a large three story building that could fit up to 40 guests. Rika Wallen bought the roadhouse in 1923 and expanded it with a 20x40 foot addition. She was named the postmaster of Big Delta in 1925 and held the position until 1947. It was considered one of the most important roadhouses along the highway and was added to the National List of Historic Places in 1976.	
Shaw Creek Roadhouse	Mile 286.7	Valdez	Although the existence of this roadhouse is unknown, a former roadhouse at this location is mentioned in 1928 by the Alaska Road Commission.	
Tenderfoot Roadhouse, Emard's Roadhouse	Mile 290	Valdez	The exact location or existence of this roadhouse is not known. Author Frank Glaser mentions that a roadhouse owned by Emard could not keep a cook because he attempted to sleep with them.	
Joe Henry's Roadhouse	Mile 294	Valdez	First mentioned in 1904, it was washed down the Tanana River sometime after 1906.	
Samuelson's Roadhouse	Mile 295	Valdez	The town of Richardson was surveyed in this area in 1905, and it grew quickly owing to the ease that sternwheelers could get up to this point in the Tanana. By 1910, Jacob Samuelson built a grocery store and added a two-story roadhouse five years later. The town washed into the Tanana River sometime later.	
McClusky's Roadhouse, Richardson Roadhouse	Mile 295	Valdez	Also located in the town of Richardson, J.W. McCusky built this two-story roadhouse in 1916. A larger building was built in 1922, but met the same fate as the town.	
Name unknown	Mile 295	Valdez	A third roadhouse in Richardson was built by Fred Wilkins, which included a grocery store. Before the town washed away, he moved it to the other side of the Tanana where it burned down in 1982.	
Birch Lake Roadhouse	Mile 306.4	Valdez	First listed in 1915, no record of its operation exists after 1922. It was operated by James "Jimmy" Chisolm.	
Overland Roadhouse, The Fox Farm Roadhouse	Mile 53	Fairbanks	Two men, Vincent and Matthews, operated this roadhouse starting in 1909 as a long one story building. By the next year, it was expanded to house about 40 people. The two first owners sold it to Frank Burgess sometime after 1910, who operated it until 1916. Sometime later, Jack Taylor took over and established a fox farm. By 1928, it was operated by Mr. and Mrs. Guy Turnbow. The roadhouse burned down in 1945.	
King and Richard's Roadhouse	Mile 53	Fairbanks	It was only in operation from 1906-1907. Nothing else is known about this roadhouse.	
Munson's Salchaket Trading Post and Roadhouse	Mile 40	Fairbanks	William F. Munson built this roadhouse in 1904 near the mouth of the Salcha River. Harry Karstens reportedly helped build in exchange for food. It was first a one story building but was replace by a two-story building sometime later. When he died in 1913, his wife Thora took over. George Hiller took over in 1915 and operated it until it burned to the ground in 1925.	
Ben Davis Roadhouse and Store	Mile 41	Fairbanks	Dr. H.L. Hedger and Ben Davis ran this roadhouse briefly. It only appeared in ads in 1905.	
Clark's Roadhouse	Mile 36	Fairbanks	This roadhouse is only listed on a distance table for the 1906-1907 season.	
Chena Slough Roadhouse, Piledriver Roadhouse, 30-mile Roadhouse	Mile 30	Fairbanks	First built as Chena Slough Roadhouse in 1904 by unknown operators, the name was changed to Piledriver Roadhouse in 1906. R.H. Michaels owned it briefly in 1909-1910 before it was managed by H.H. Hadley and John Morgan 1910 onward, who renamed it 30-mile Roadhouse. Morgan became the sole proprietor by 1918, but it is unknown when the roadhouse shutdown. By 1923, it was no longer listed on distance tables.	
Byler's Roadhouse, Bergman's Roadhouse, Eighteen-Mile Roadhouse	Mile 18	Fairbanks	First built by Jonathan Byler in 1907, he sold it in 1915-1916, when the name was changed to Bergman's Roadhouse. By 1922, it was renamed to Eighteen-Mile Roadhouse. John Sullivan of the Sullivan Roadhouse took over that same year. It was a popular tourist attraction in the 20s. George Mutchler took over operations in 1928. It is unknown when this roadhouse stopped operating.	
Johnson's Roadhouse, 16-mile House	Mile 16	Fairbanks	Mr. and Mrs. J. Johnson built this roadhouse in 1906 and could fit up to 35 travelers. It is unknown when this roadhouse shut down, but it shows up as 16-mile House in distance tables published in 1910 and 1912.	
Dolan's Roadhouse	Mile 16	Fairbanks	This roadhouse is only listed during the winter 1904-1905 season.	
Murray's Roadhouse, Eight Mile Roadhouse, Nine Mile Roadhouse	Mile 8 or 9	Fairbanks	The roadhouse was first listed as Murray's in 1904. It passed through several owners, J.R. Moore in 1910, Dick Wittington from 1911 to 1916, and William St. Louis in 1918. By 1928, it was turned into a farmhouse.	
White's Roadhouse	Mile 9	Fairbanks	The only listing for this roadhouse is in 1907. Nothing else is known about this roadhouse.	

== Recent and future improvements ==
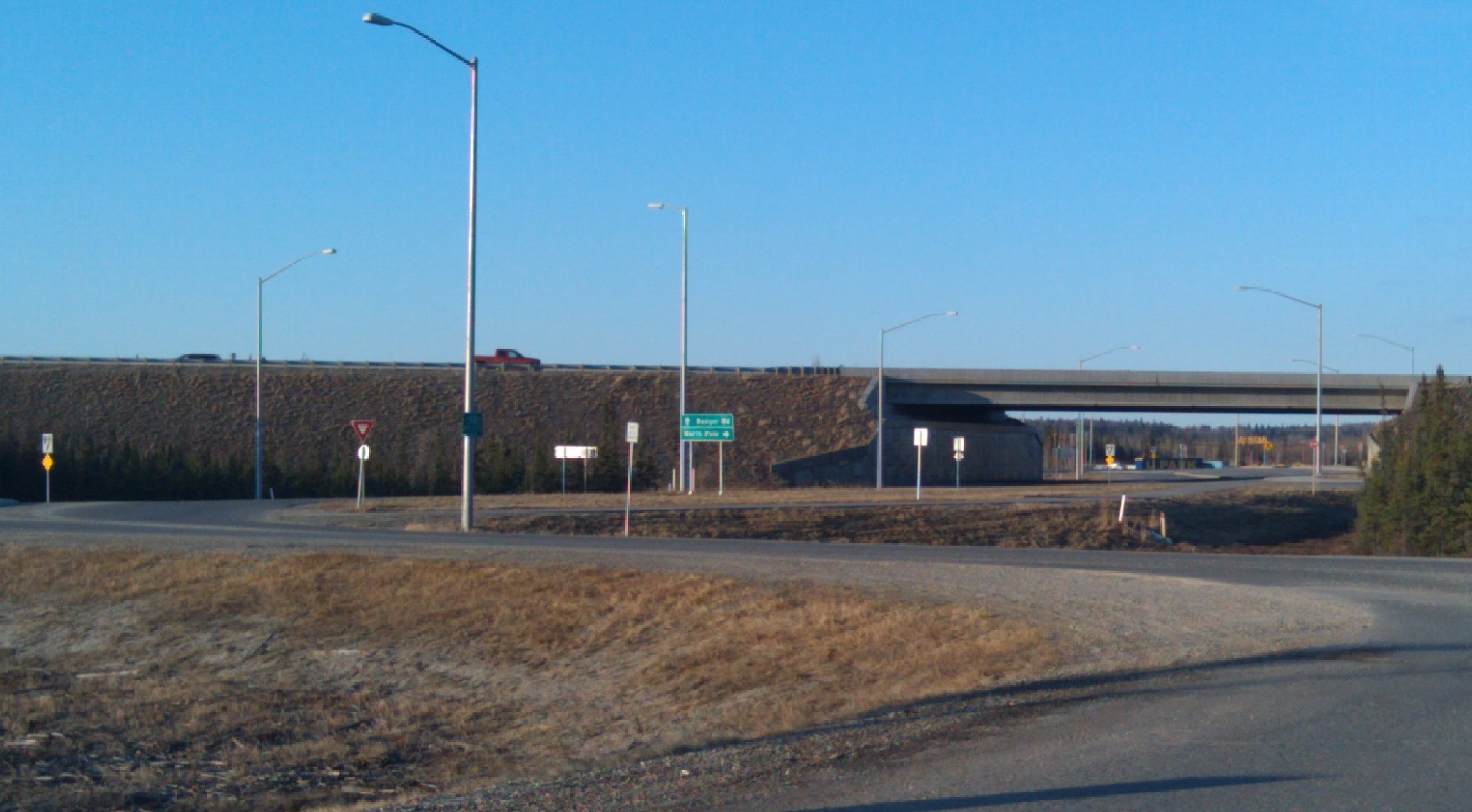
Interchange with the Fairbanks end of Badger Road, a loop road serving suburban parts of the North Pole area. The interchange was constructed in the early 2000s, after an approximately three-decade history of serious accidents at the previous at-grade intersection.

- During the 1990s, the highway was upgraded from Fairbanks to the main gate at Eielson AFB, making this stretch a 4-lane divided road. Intersections with other roads, however, are still almost entirely at-grade.
- Under SAFETEA-LU, Alaska Route 2 from the Canadian border to Fairbanks, comprising parts of the Richardson and Alaska Highways, has been declared a High Priority Corridor (Corridor 67). What this means for the distant future is not yet certain; although SAFETEA-LU does explicitly provide federal funds for upgrading the road to 4 lanes and divided, from Salcha to Delta Junction.

== Interstate Highway System ==
Interstate A1 and Interstate A2
- Location: Delta Junction to Fairbanks
- Length: 325.38 mi (523.65 km)
- Existed: 1976–present

Richardson Highway is part of the unsigned part of the Interstate Highway System east of Fairbanks. The entire length of Interstate A-2 follows Route 2 from the George Parks Highway (Interstate A-4) junction in Fairbanks to Tok, east of which Route 2 carries Interstate A-1 off the Tok Cut-Off Highway to the international border. Only a short piece of the Richardson Highway in Fairbanks is built to freeway standards.

== Major intersections ==
Borough	Location	mi	km	Destinations	Notes
Unorganized	Valdez	0	0.0	Alaska Marine Highway	Southern terminus of Alaska Route 4 & Richardson Highway
Unorganized	Willow Creek			AK-10 east (Edgerton Highway)	Western terminus of Alaska Route 10
Unorganized	Willow Creek			Old Edgerton Highway	
Unorganized	Copper Center	100	160	Old Richardson Highway	
Unorganized	Glennallen	115	185	AK-1 south (Glenn Highway) – Anchorage	Southern terminus of concurrency with Alaska Route 1; Northern terminus of Glenn Highway
Unorganized	Gakona	129	208	AK-1 north (Tok Cut-Off Highway) – Tok	Northern terminus of concurrency with Alaska Route 1; Southern terminus of Tok Cut-Off Highway
Unorganized	Paxson	186	299	AK-8 west (Denali Highway) – Denali National Park	Eastern terminus of Alaska Route 8 & Denali Highway
Unorganized	Delta Junction	266	428	AK-2 south (Alaska Highway)	Northern terminus of Alaska Route 4, Alaska Route 2 continues north as the Richardson Highway
See AK-2
Fairbanks North Star	Fairbanks	368	592	AK-2 north (Steese Expressway) / Airport Way	Northern terminus of the Richardson Highway; Alaska Route 2 continues north as the Steese Expressway
1.000 mi = 1.609 km; 1.000 km = 0.621 mi: Concurrency terminus; Route transition

== Gallery ==
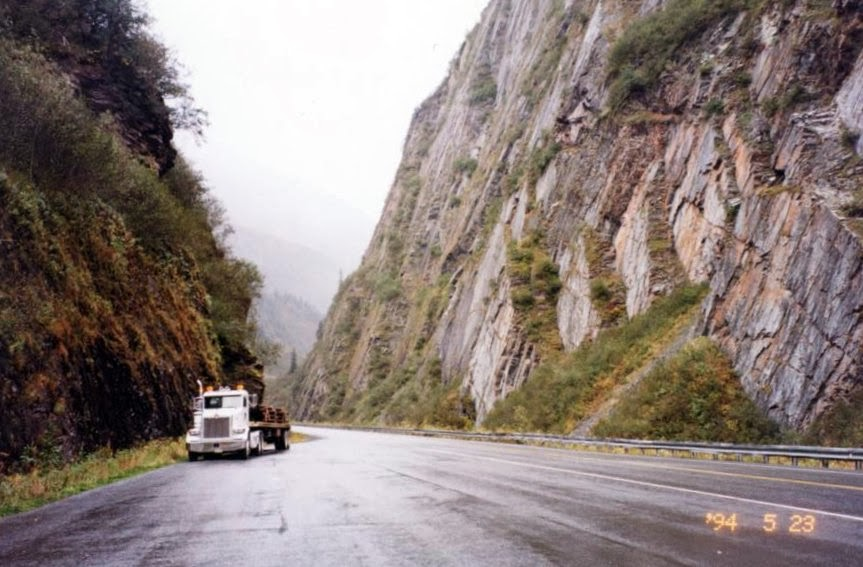
The highway in Keystone Canyon, just north of Valdez

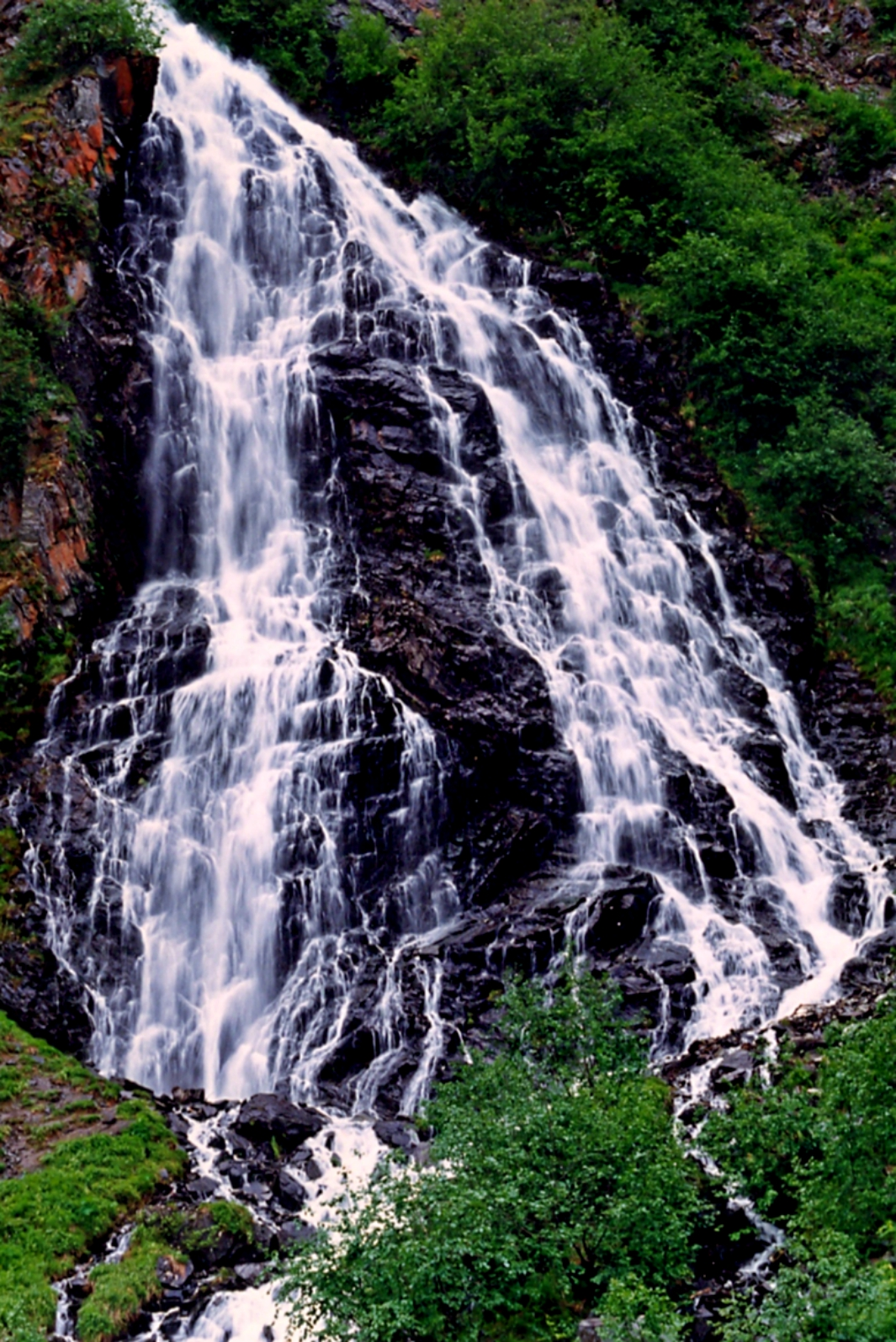
Horsetail falls, one of many waterfalls visible as the highway traverses Keystone Canyon

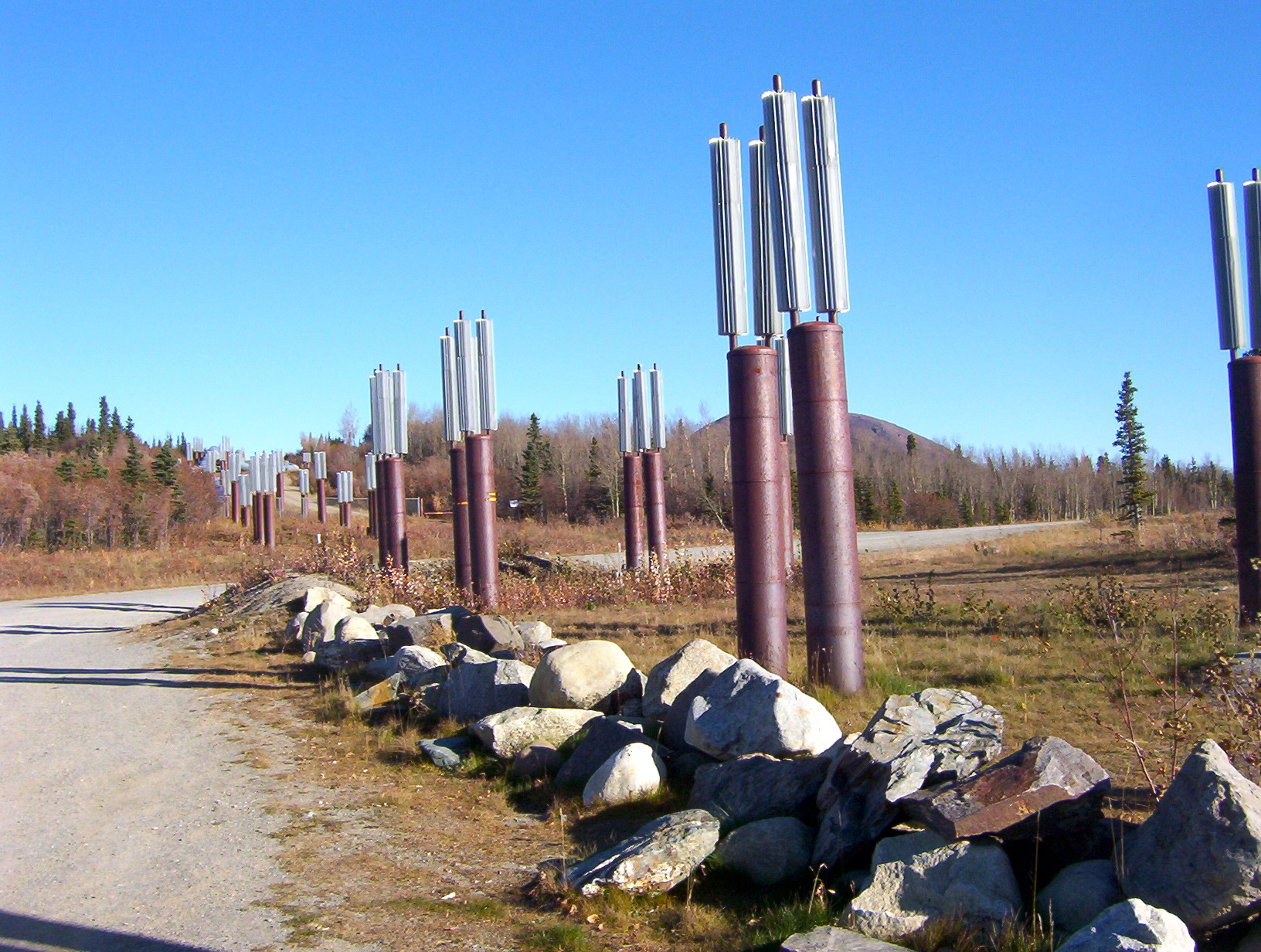
A buried crossing of the highway by the oil pipeline.

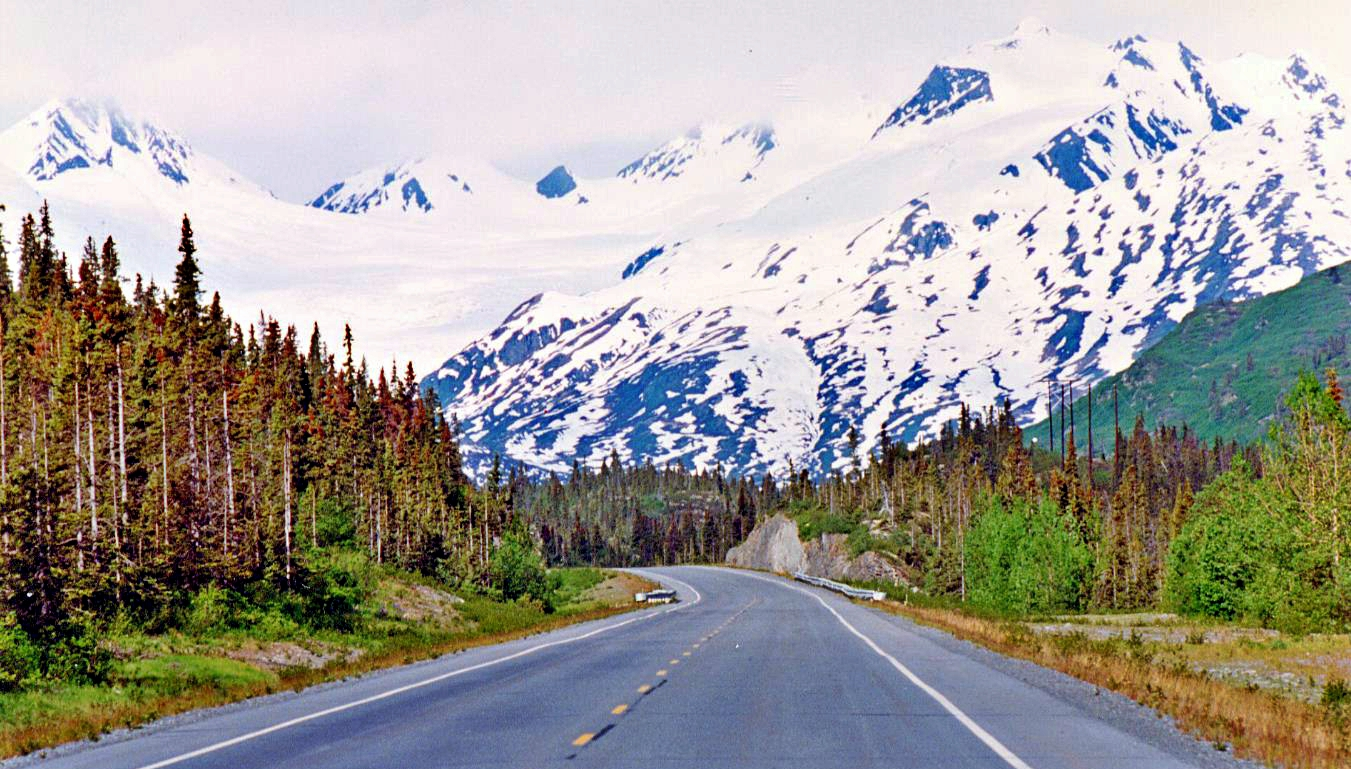
Worthington Glacier seen from the highway
