= Mount Billy Mitchell (Chugach Mountains) =

Mountain in Alaska, United States

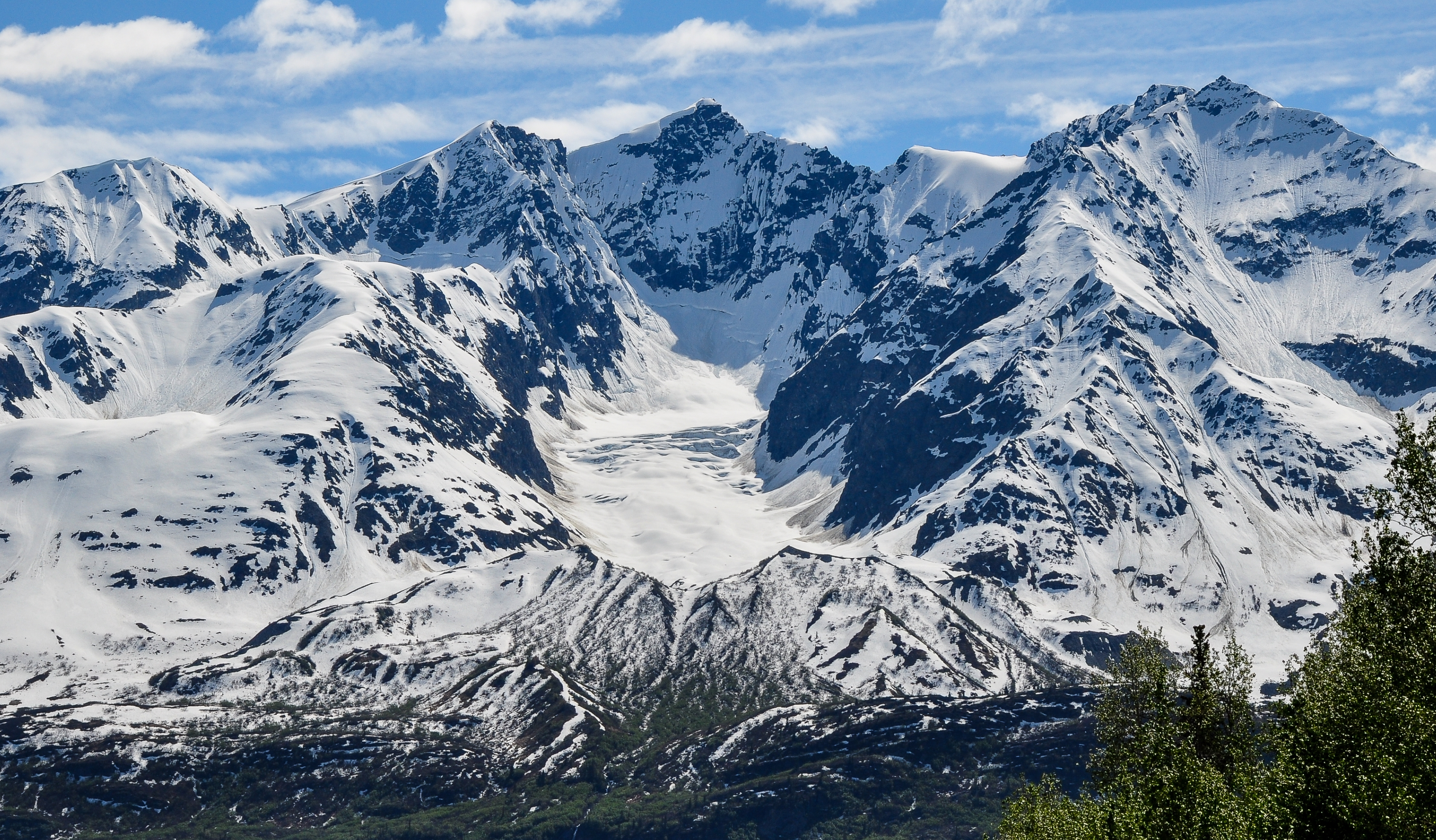
- View of the north (leeward) face of Mount Billy Mitchell from mile marker 48 along the Richardson Highway. An unnamed glacier is visible in the cirque.

Highest point
- Elevation: 7,217 ft (2,200 m) NGVD 29
- Listing: Mountains of Alaska
- Coordinates: 61°12′12″N 145°16′27″W

Geography
- Location within Alaska
- Interactive map of Mount Billy Mitchell
- Location: Valdez–Cordova Census Area, Alaska, United States
- Parent range: Chugach Mountains
- Topo map: USGS Valdez A-4

Mount Billy Mitchell is a prominent 6,919-foot (2,109 m) peak located in the Chugach Mountains, 35 miles (56 km) east of Valdez and 12 miles (19 km) west of the Copper River in the U.S. state of Alaska. This mountain forms a prominent and easily visible landmark between mile markers 43 and 51 of the Richardson Highway, as the highway passes just to its west between Tonsina and the Thompson Pass (see photograph).

Mount Billy Mitchell was named for William "Billy" Mitchell (1879–1936), a brigadier general of the United States Army Air Service who is often referred to as the "father of the United States Air Force".

== Naming ==
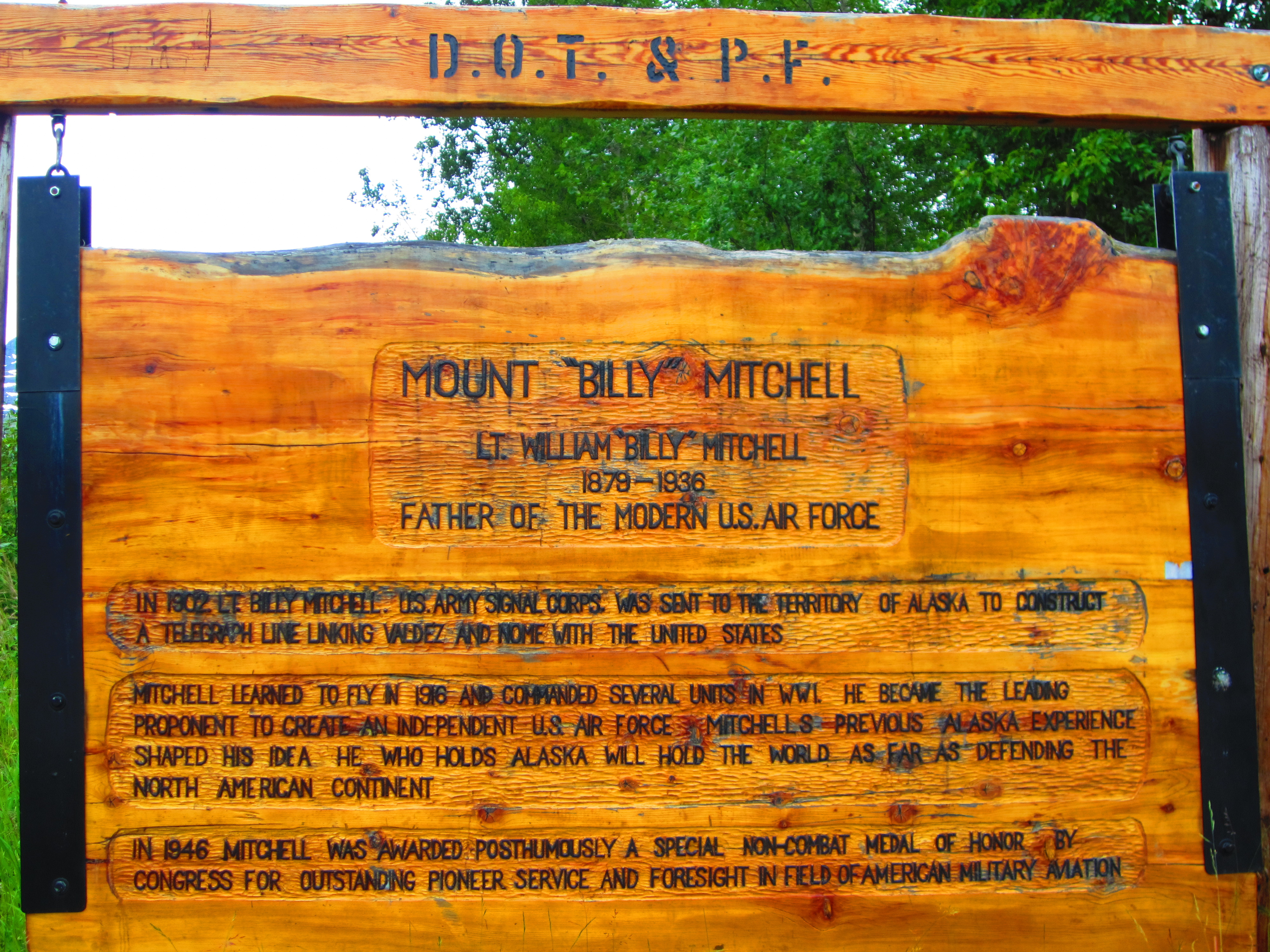
Historical marker placed by the Alaska Department of Transportation & Public Facilities along the Richardson Highway, just south of mile marker 48

In response to the Klondike Gold Rush, the United States Army established numerous military outposts throughout the District of Alaska. As a lieutenant in the United States Army Signal Corps, Mitchell was stationed in Alaska at that time. On May 26, 1900, the United States Congress appropriated $450,000 in order to establish a communications system to connect the many isolated and widely separated U.S. Army outposts and civilian Gold Rush camps in Alaska by telegraph. Along with Captain George C. Brunnell, Lieutenant Mitchell oversaw the construction of what became known as the Washington-Alaska Military Cable and Telegraph System (WAMCATS).

Construction of the WAMCATS system began in the summer of 1900. Stretching from Fort Liscum at Valdez in Southcentral Alaska to Fort Egbert at Eagle on the Canada–United States border to Fort St. Michael to Nome on the Seward Peninsula, construction crews completed the final overland connection south of Fairbanks on June 27, 1903. By the time WAMCATS was fully operational in 1904, the system included almost 1,400 miles (2,253 km) of overland telegraph cable, over 2,000 miles (3,219 km) of submarine communications cable, and a 107 miles (172 km) wireless telegraphy system crossing the Norton Sound to Nome. This telegraph line was the first to link American outposts in Eagle, Valdez and Nome with each other as well as to Washington, D.C. in the contiguous United States. Among the greatest logistical and technological achievements of its day, the WAMCATS included the first successful long-distance radio operation in the world.

A historical marker is located at a roadside highway turnout just north of where the Richardson Highway crosses the Tiekel River. Placed by the Alaska Department of Transportation & Public Facilities, the text reads (see photograph):

Mount "Billy" Mitchell: Lt. William "Billy" Mitchell (1879–1936), father of the modern U.S. Air Force. In 1902 Lt. Billy Mitchell, U.S. Army Signal Corps, was sent to the territory of Alaska to construct a telegraph line linking Valdez and Nome to the United States. Mitchell learned to fly in 1916 and commanded several units in WWI. He became the leading proponent to create an independent U.S. Air Force. Mitchell's previous Alaska experience shaped his idea: he who holds Alaska will hold the world, as far as defending the North American continent. In 1946 Mitchell was awarded posthumously a special non-combat Medal of Honor by Congress for outstanding pioneer service and foresight in field of American Military Aviation.

== Glaciers ==
The climate of the Chugach Mountains is strongly influenced by its location close to Prince William Sound and especially the Gulf of Alaska. The Gulf of Alaska generates powerful winter storms which drive heavy precipitation northwards into southern and Southcentral Alaska, including the Chugach Mountains. More snow falls in the vicinity of Valdez—an average annual snowfall of 279 inches (709 cm)—than in any other location in the United States. Over thousands of years, this snow has accumulated to form glaciers on Mount Billy Mitchell, especially on its north face, which is its leeward side. Despite this long-term glaciation and even in the face of continuing heavy snowfall (the winter of 2011-2012 saw record snowfall in this area), the rate of ablation has exceeded the rate of accumulation over the past few decades. Because of this, Mount Billy Mitchell's glaciers have retreated significantly in recent years.

== See also ==
- Billy Mitchell (volcano)
- Worthington Glacier
