= Fort Liscum =

Coordinates: 61°05′09″N 146°21′31″W

Fort Liscum was a United States Army post in the Alaska Territory on the south shore of Valdez Bay, across from the modern site of Valdez, Alaska. It operated from 1900 to 1922.

== History ==
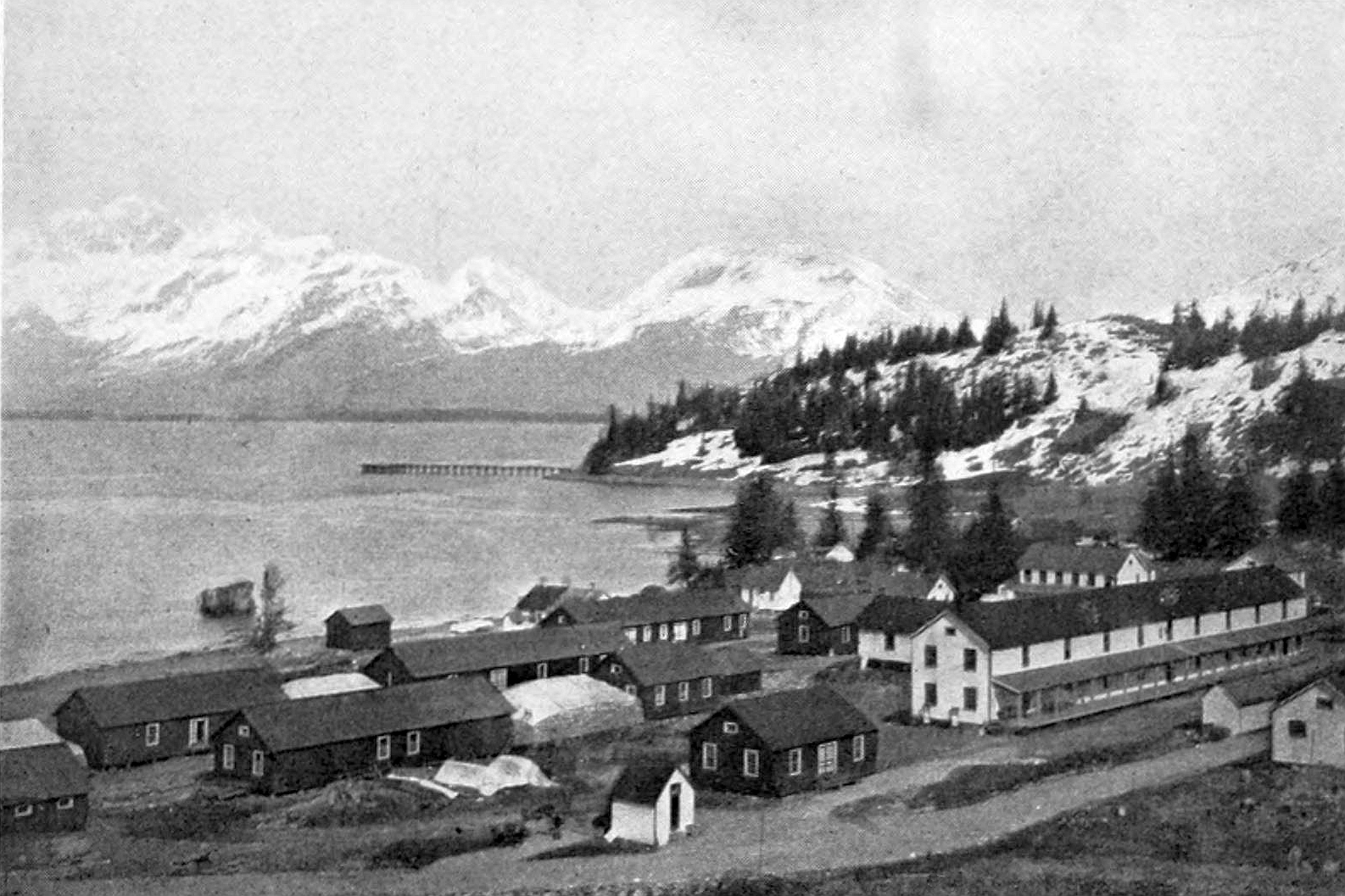
Fort Liscum, 1891

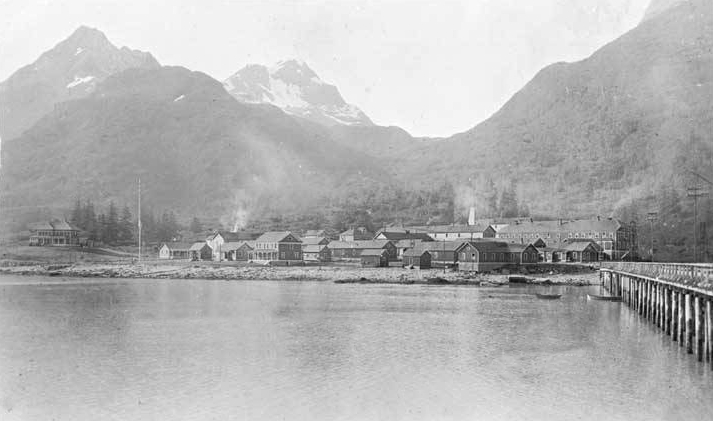
Postcard of Fort Liscum, 1913

In 1899, Captain William R. Abercrombie designated a site for a military reservation at Port Valdez. Port Valdez was the trail head for the Valdez-Eagle Trail to Fort Egbert, near Eagle, Alaska. Abercrombie selected 650 acres on the south side of the bay near a point known as Ludington's Landing. The site was chosen for its deep anchorage, a nearby mountain stream providing a continuous supply of fresh water, and a location, in Abercrombie's words, "just far enough from the head of Port Valdez to be beyond the influences of the whisky element to be found in frontier towns." The head of Port Valdez was the original site of Valdez, Alaska, which, as the start of the "All-American Route" to the Klondike, attracted a steady stream of prospectors.

=== Construction and operation ===
In May 1900, 100 soldiers arrived to establish the post and begin construction. The completed installation numbered 37 buildings, including two-story quarters for officers and civilians, a hospital, a stable, and a bakery. A U.S. War Department report described the facility as "well constructed" and easily supplied, but lamented the "unfortunate" location, where northern exposure and shadows cast by the overlooking mountains ensured that winter snow would not melt until June. On September 6, 1900, the post was named Fort Liscum in honor of Colonel Emerson H. Liscum, who had died July 13, 1900, in Tianjin, China leading the U.S. Army's 9th Infantry Regiment as part of the Eight-Nation Alliance to put down the Boxer Rebellion. The 9th Infantry Regiment was later stationed at the fort.

On August 24, 1902, the Washington-Alaska Military Cable and Telegraph System (WAMCATS) connected Fort Liscum with Fort Egbert.

In 1903, Captain Eugene T. Wilson, commander at Fort Liscum, reported that the 1901 law banning the sale of alcohol on army bases was having an adverse effect on his command. "The object of a company commander," wrote Wilson, "is to promote temperance, to make his men sober, and keep them in good physical and moral health. I cannot do it now when Tom, Dick and Harry are calling to them to leave the garrison and get drunk."

In 1914, soldiers from Fort Liscum helped to construct a dike around the town Valdez, which had been subject to annual floods due to seasonal runoff from the Valdez Glacier.

Fort Liscum was closed in 1922, one of many military facilities closed in the years following World War I. The population of Valdez, which had peaked at 7,000 during the gold rush years, fell below 500 people after the Army departed.

=== Legacy ===
In 1925, the land was transferred to the U.S. Dept. of the Interior, which sold a number of the buildings for relocation. In 1929, the land was claimed as a homestead by Andrew and Oma Belle Day, who renamed it Dayville, opening a cannery and a sawmill on the site. The Trans-Alaska Pipeline marine terminal, which commenced operation in 1977, was built on land that had been reserved for Fort Liscum.

A field gun from Fort Liscum is displayed in the Valdez Museum.

== Demographics ==
Historical population
Census	Pop.	Note	%±
1910	162		—
1920	153		−5.6%

Fort Liscum appeared on the 1910 and 1920 U.S. Censuses as an unincorporated military installation. It would later become the village of Dayville on the 1940 U.S. Census and is presently located within the city of Valdez.

== See also ==
- Liscum Bowl
- Mount Billy Mitchell (Chugach Mountains)
