= Omega Peak =

Mountain in the country of Canada

- Location within Alberta Location within British Columbia Location within Canada

Highest point
- Elevation: 3,060 m (10,040 ft)
- Prominence: 296 m (971 ft)
- Parent peak: Watershed Peak (3158 m)
- Listing: Mountains of Alberta; Mountains of British Columbia
- Coordinates: 52°07′45″N 117°34′44″W

Geography
- Country: Canada
- Provinces: Alberta and British Columbia
- District: Kootenay
- Protected area: Jasper National Park
- Parent range: Park Ranges
- Topo map: NTS 83C4 Clemenceau Icefield

Omega Peak is located on the border of Alberta and British Columbia, between the head of the Sullivan River and Columbia Icefield. It was named in 1939 because it was the last unclimbed peak over 10,000 ft (3,048 m) between the Thompson and Yellowhead Passes.

== See also ==
- List of peaks on the British Columbia–Alberta border
- List of mountains in the Canadian Rockies
