= Keystone Canyon =

Gorge near Valdez, Alaska

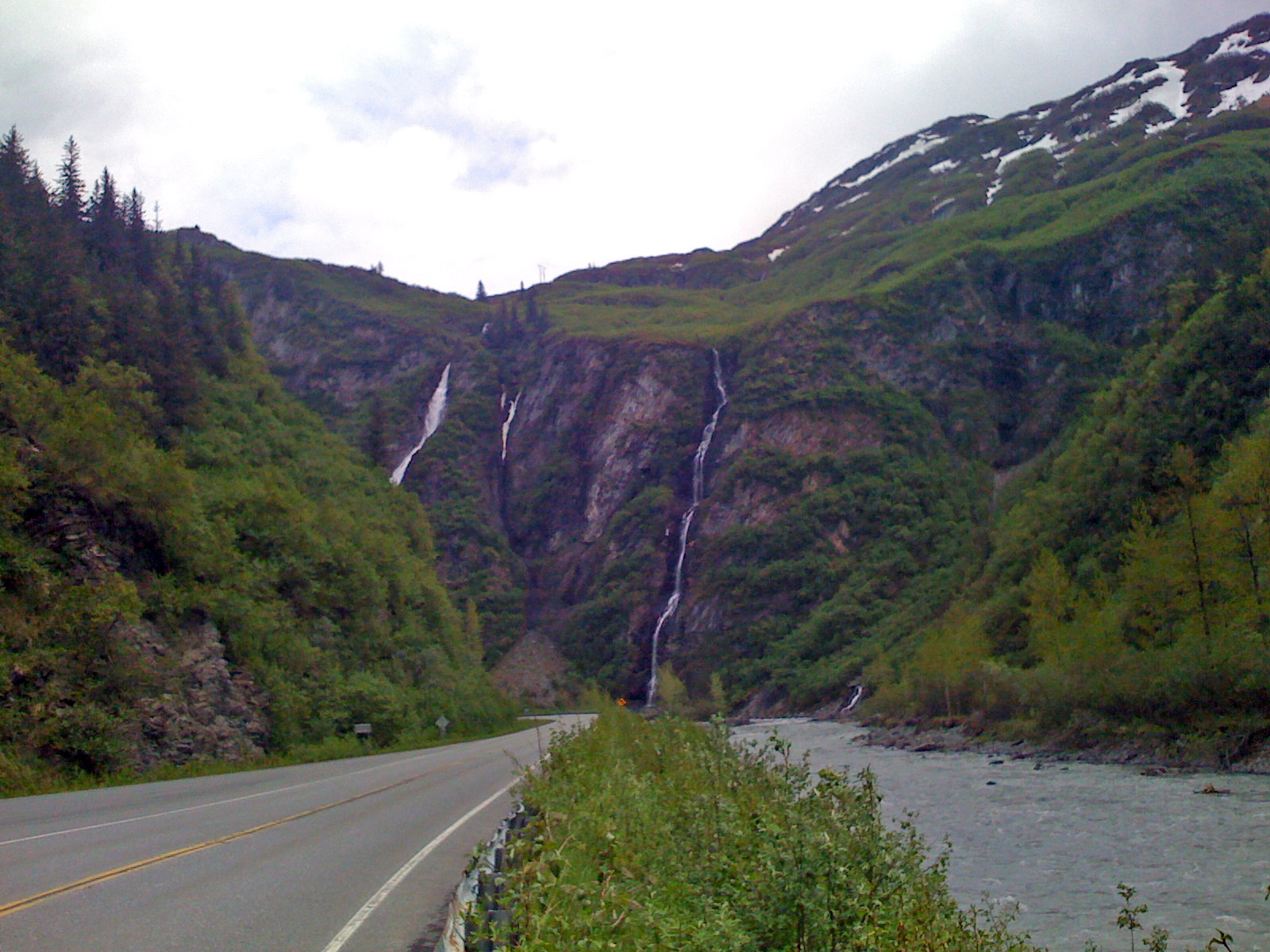
- View of Keystone Canyon along the Richardson Highway

- Location within Alaska
- Floor elevation: 307 feet (94 meters)
- Length: 3 m (9.8 ft)

Geography
- Location: Chugach Census Area, Alaska, United States
- Coordinates: 61°04′41″N 145°53′57″W
- Rivers: Lowe River
- Interactive map of Keystone Canyon

Keystone Canyon is a gorge near Valdez in the U.S. state of Alaska. Situated at an elevation of 307 feet (94 m), its walls are almost perpendicular. It measures 3 miles (4.8 km) in length, connecting the upper and lower valleys of Lowe River.

== Geography ==
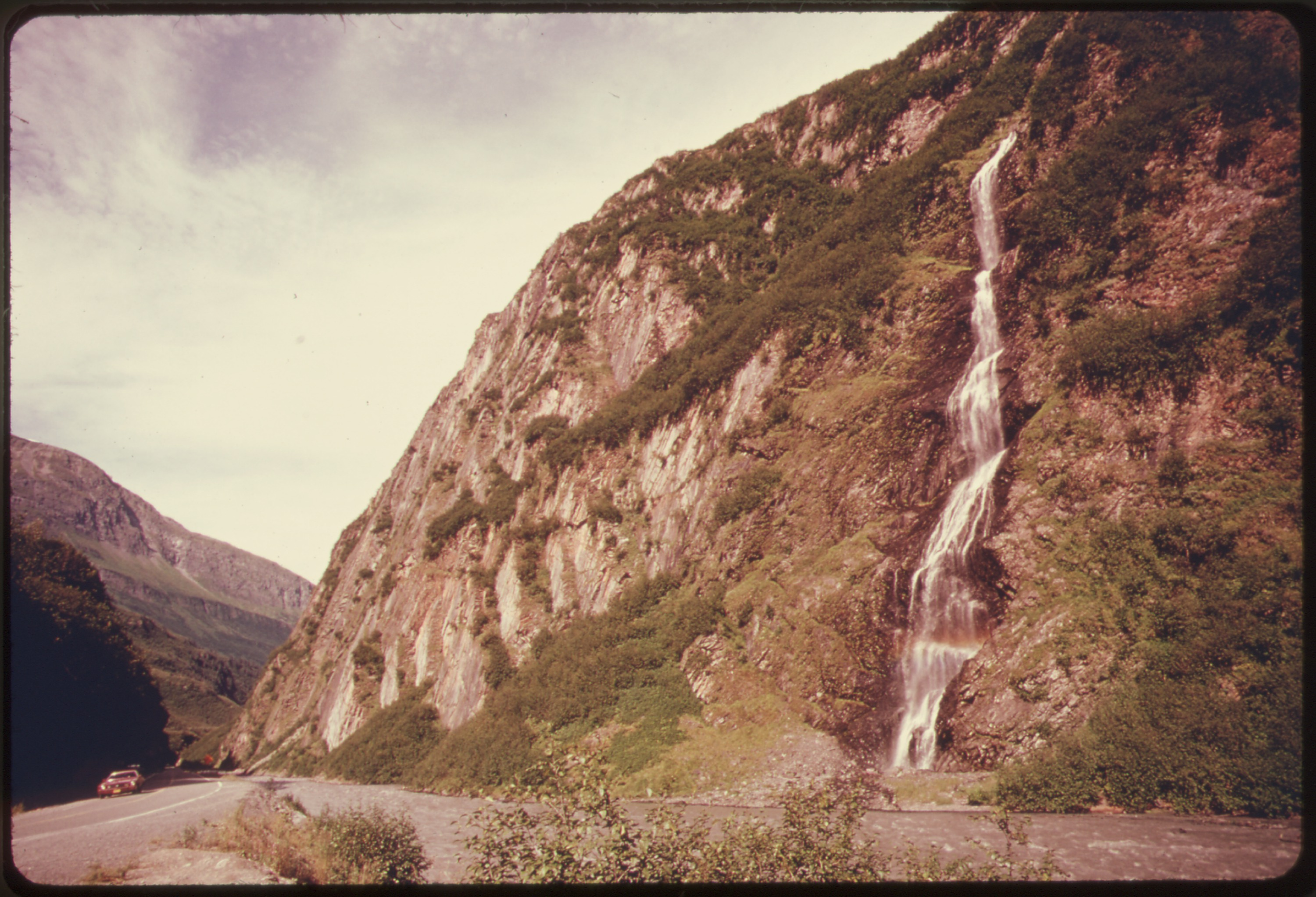
View north along the Lowe River into the narrowest sections of Keystone Canyon with Bridal Veil Falls dropping to the Lowe.

In Keystone Canyon, the mother rock of the country shows up to good advantage. It is all slate. Its cleavage is nearly vertical and easy to drill, except where small seams of quartz exist. The slate rock on the south side of the summit is firm and solid as a rule, but on the north side it is very much disintegrated. The bed of the canyon varies from 100–500 feet (30–152 m) in width. The vegetation growing on the low bottoms, consisting of grass, brush, and trees, indicates that, as a rule, the water does not rise more than 4 feet (1.2 m) in nearly the whole length of the canyon. Keystone Canyon is entered by going through a low pass in a spur divide, which forms the west side of the mouth of the canyon. The east wall is more abrupt than the west wall. There is but little side drainage to the canyon, and this is easily provided for by small culverts, with the exception of Waterfall Creek. This little stream forms a cascade with falls of several hundred feet in height, and finally buries itself in the loose rock at the base of the canyon wall. For a quarter of a mile, about the middle of the canyon, narrows are formed by the side walls being nearer together; there are abrupt walls 50–75 feet (15–23 m) in height. At the head of the canyon the river, dashing against a perpendicular wall of rock, is sharply deflected to the left for 600 feet (180 m), and then gradually assumes its general direction, which it follows closely to the mouth of the canyon.

Horsetail Falls and Bridal Veil Falls are located within the canyon, as is the Richardson Highway. The Valdez-Eagle Trail passes through the canyon's south end.

== History ==
It was named by William R. Abercrombie after the "Keystone State" of Pennsylvania.

== Features ==
=== Waterfalls ===
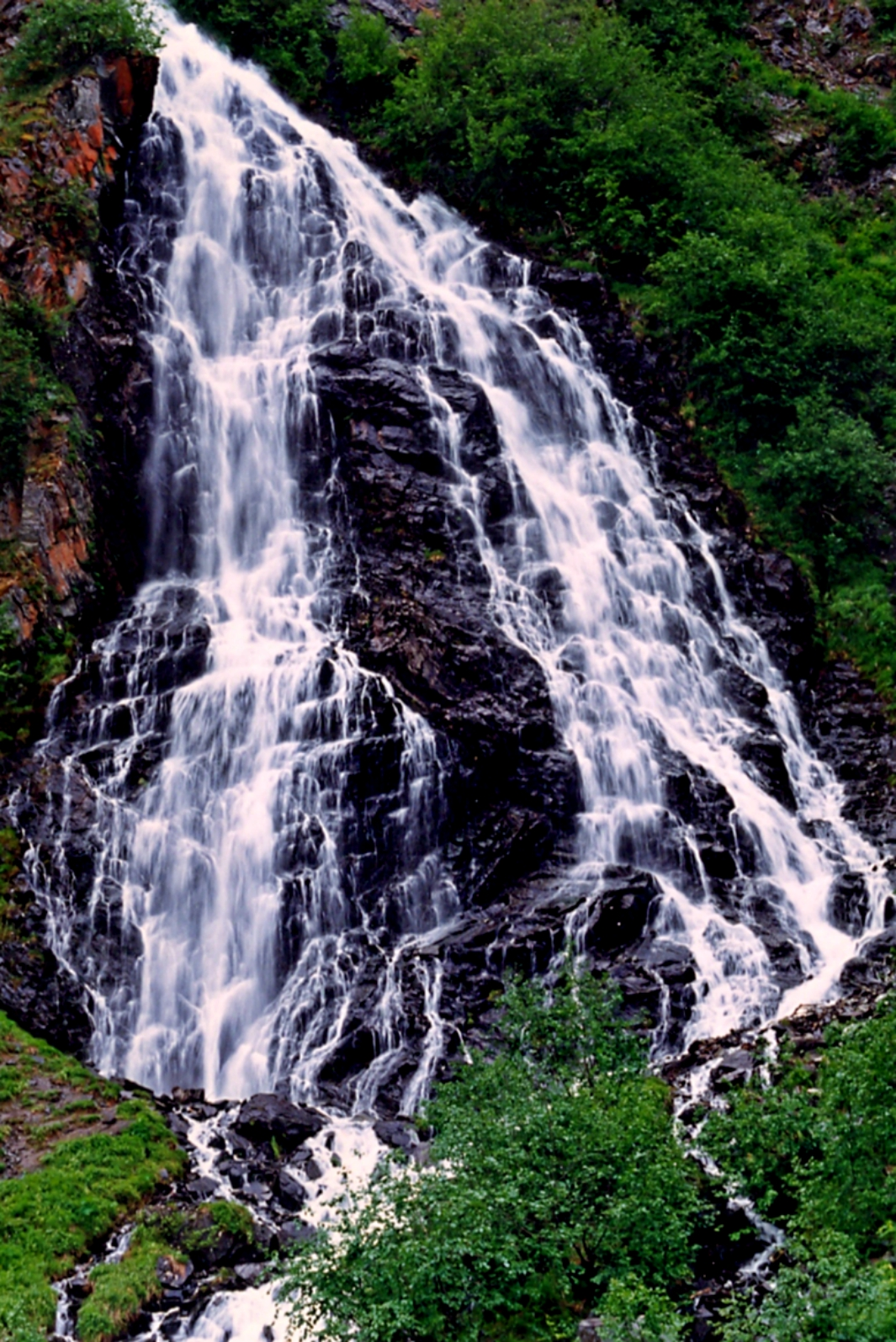
Horsetail Falls

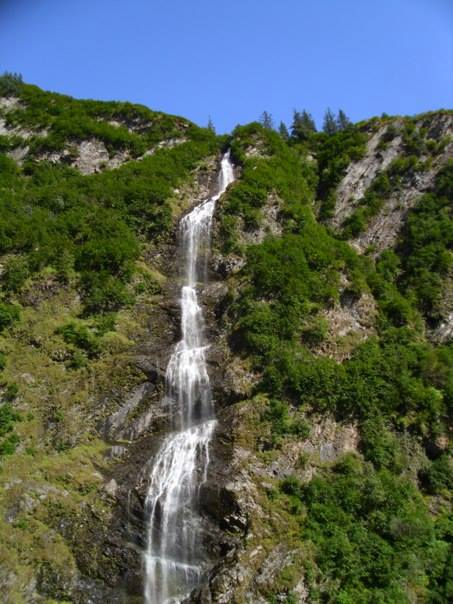
Bridal Veil Falls

There are numerous small waterfalls in the canyon, and two more spectacular ones: Horsetail Falls is a picturesque 328 feet (100 m) waterfall that flows into the Lowe River. The waterfall can be seen and photographed from a road turnout along the Richardson Highway 13 miles from Valdez, Alaska.

Bridal Veil Falls can be viewed from a turnout at about 4/10 mile (0.64 km) north of Horsetail Falls. This is also the trailhead for the "Valdez Goat Trail", a section of the Trans Alaska Military Packtrain Trail, founded during the Klondike Gold Rush.

=== Tunnel ===
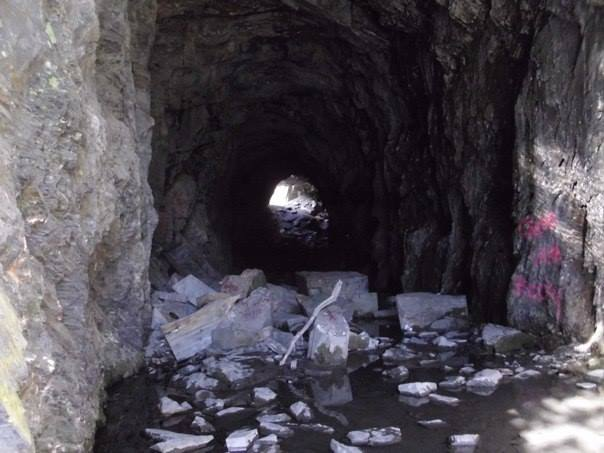
The aborted railroad tunnel

The canyon was part of the proposed route of a railroad to access the minerals of Interior Alaska. Nine different companies hoped to complete a railroad to the interior of Alaska. The only remaining sign of these efforts in Keystone Canyon is a short section of hand-cut tunnel. A feud developed and a gunfight ensued, after which the effort was abandoned. The silent movie The Iron Trail is about this era.

== See also ==
- Thompson Pass, the area north of the canyon
- Hogback Ridge, forms the west wall of the canyon
