= Harry C. Egbert =

United States Army generaL (1839–1899)

Harry Clay Egbert
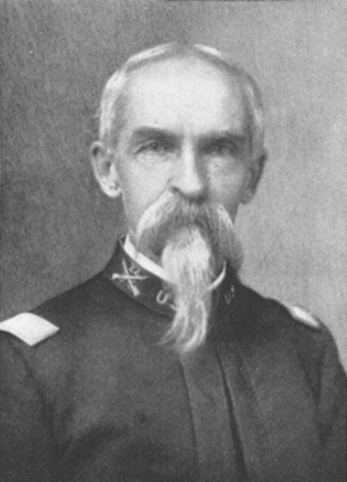
- Born: January 3, 1839; Philadelphia, Pennsylvania
- Died: March 26, 1899 (aged 60) Polo, Bulacan, Philippines
- Buried: Arlington National Cemetery
- Allegiance: United States
- Branch: United States Army
- Service years: 1861–1899
- Rank: Brigadier General of Volunteers
- Commands: 6th Infantry Regiment; 22nd Infantry Regiment
- Conflicts: American Civil War: Battle of Gaines' Mill; Battle of Malvern Hill; Battle of Cedar Mountain; Battle of Gettysburg; Spanish–American War: Battle of San Juan Hill; Philippine–American War: Battle of Manila (DOW)

Harry Clay Egbert (January 3, 1839 – March 26, 1899) was an officer in the United States Army who served in the American Civil War, the Spanish–American War, and the Philippine–American War. He commanded the 6th Infantry Regiment during the Battle of San Juan Hill but suffered a mortal wound during the Battle of Manila.

== Biography ==
Born in Philadelphia, Egbert joined the Union Army during the American Civil War, being commissioned a first lieutenant in the 12th U.S. Infantry Regiment on September 23, 1861. With the Army of the Potomac, Egbert participated in the battles of Gaines Mills and Malvern Hills. He was taken prisoner twice, during the battles of Cedar Mountain and Gettysburg, being exchanged once and escaping during Robert E. Lee's retreat from Gettysburg. He was wounded in the Battle of Bethesda Church. He was promoted to captain on April 1, 1865.

After the Civil War, he remained in the army. It would be 25 years before his next promotion, to major on April 23, 1890.

Egbert was a lieutenant colonel at the start of the Spanish–American War. He commanded the 6th Infantry Regiment in the Santiago campaign until he was wounded in the Battle of San Juan Hill on July 1, 1898. While still recovering, he was promoted to colonel of the 22nd U.S. Infantry Regiment. On October 1, 1898, he was made a Brigadier General of U.S. Volunteers. That same year he became a Veteran Companion of the Military Order of Foreign Wars.

He was then sent to the Philippines for the Philippine–American War, arriving in Manila on March 4, 1899. During the Battle of Malinta, he was mortally wounded while leading a charge against Filipino forces in Malinta, Polo, Bulacan (present day city of Valenzuela, now part of Metro Manila) on March 26, and died the same day. In September 2012, at 118 Maysan Road, near his death location, the LGU of the City of Valenzuela made a cannon which was called Egbert Memorial Cannon.

Harry Egbert is buried in Arlington National Cemetery with his wife, Ellen Young Egbert (1843–1913).

Fort Egbert (1899–1911) in Eagle, Alaska was named for him, as is Egbert Avenue in San Francisco, California.
