= Worthington Glacier =

Valley glacier adjacent to Thompson Pass in Alaska

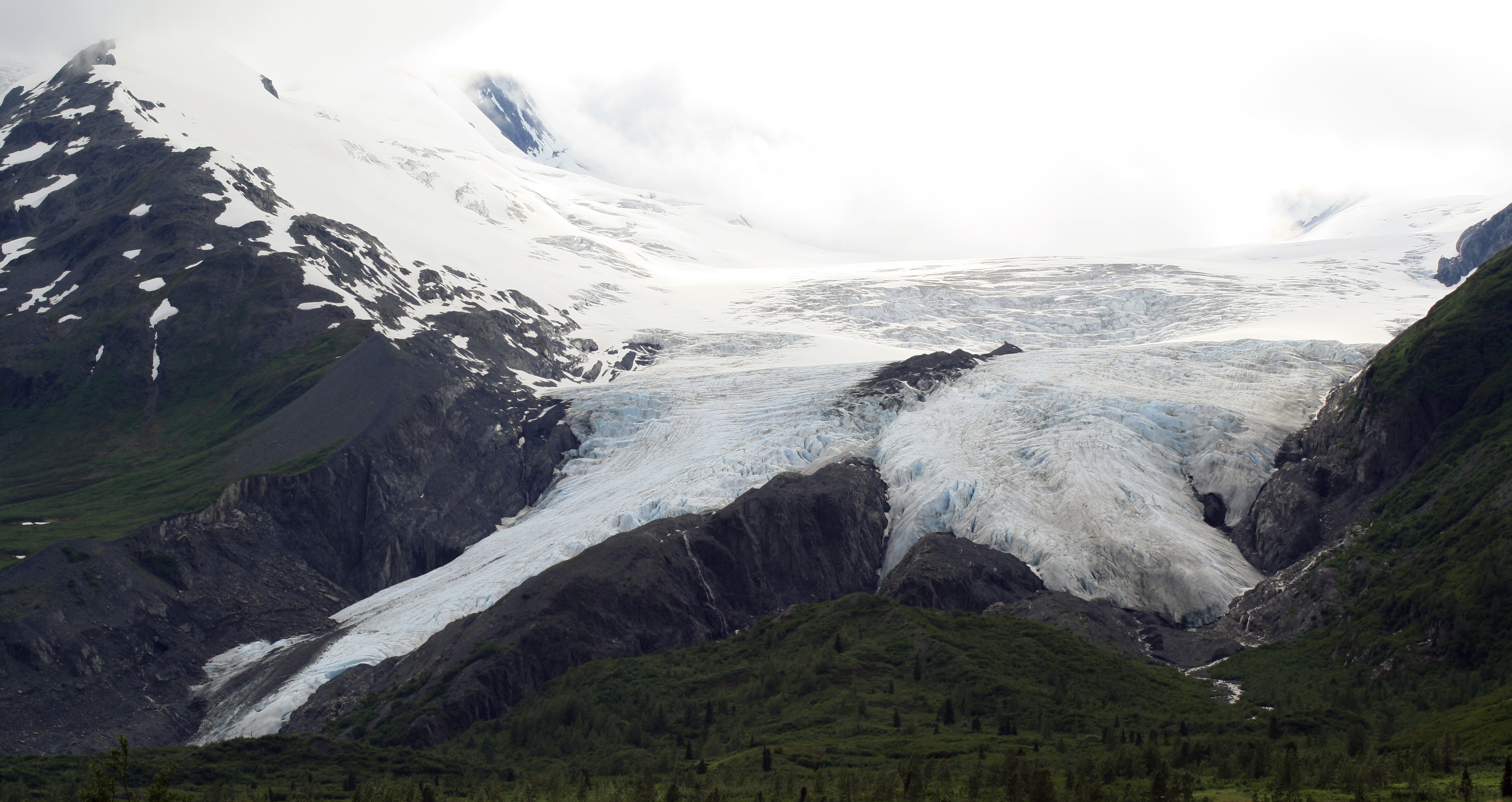
- Worthington glacier

- Location within Alaska
- Interactive map of Worthington Glacier
- Type: Valley
- Location: Alaska
- Coordinates: 61°10′13″N 145°45′48″W
- Area: 5,774 acres (2,337 ha)
- Status: Receding

U.S. National Natural Landmark
- Designated: 1968

The Worthington Glacier is a 5,774-acre (2,337 ha) valley glacier located adjacent to Thompson Pass in the southeastern mainland section of the U.S. state of Alaska.

== Geography ==
Worthington Glacier, Right Side, Alaska

Worthington Glacier is Located on the Richardson Highway at milepost 28.7 mi (46 km) east of Valdez, it was listed as a National Natural Landmark in 1968. The Worthington Glacier State Recreation Site, a 113-acre (0.46 km^{2}) roadside park operated by the state of Alaska, offers a view of the glacier, and it is acclaimed as one of the remaining U.S. glaciers that is accessible by paved highway. Like most of Alaska's glaciers, this glacier has been steadily retreating for the last 150 years, but not as dramatically as many others.

== See also ==
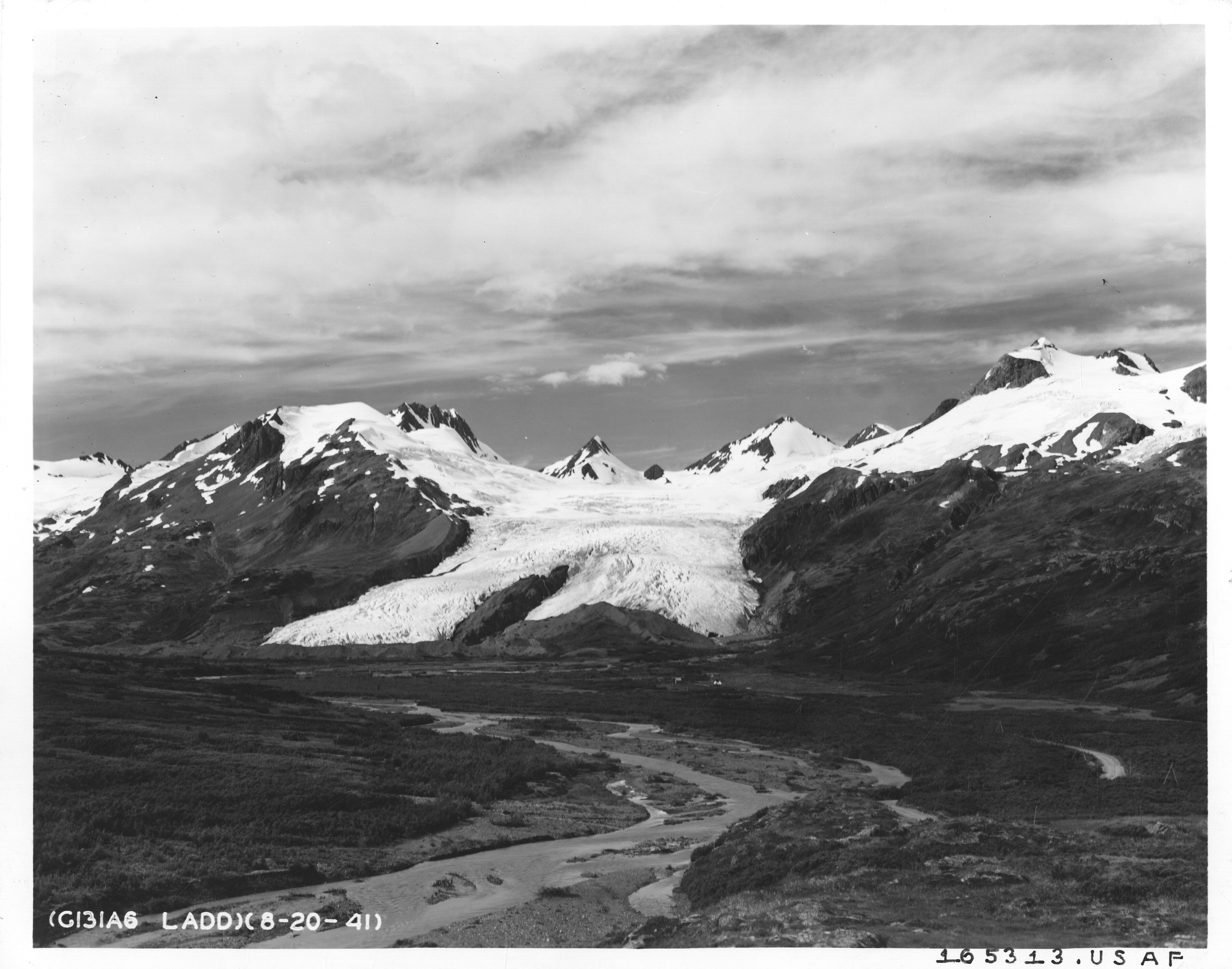
Glacier in 1941

- Mount Billy Mitchell (Chugach Mountains)
- Girls Mountain
