= Donnelly Dome =

Mountain in Alaska, United States of America

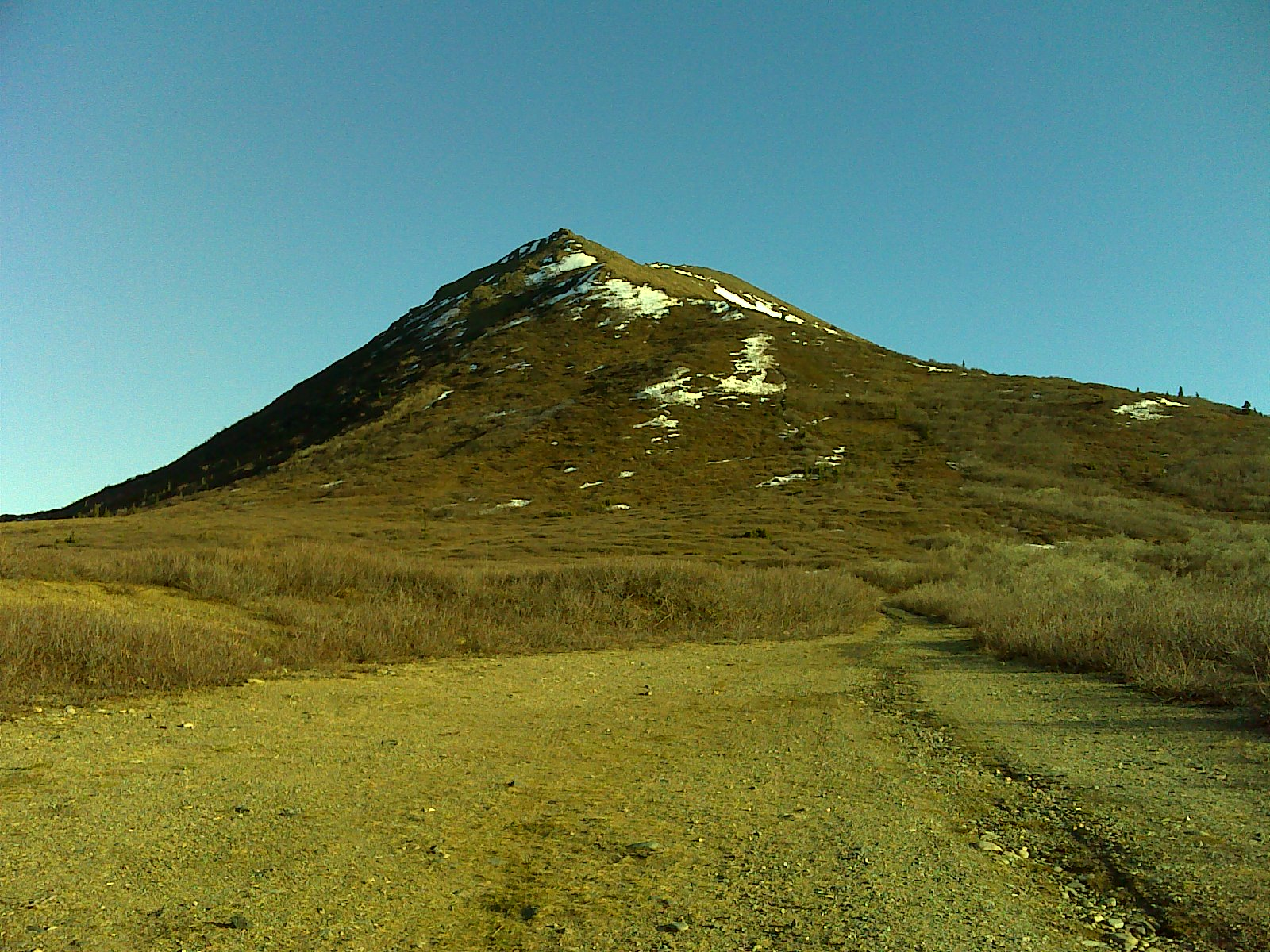
- Donnelly Dome, AK, 2010

Highest point
- Elevation: 3,832 ft (1,168 m)
- Coordinates: 63.7830556°N 145.7905556°W

Geography
- Location within Alaska

Geology
- Formed by: Glaciation

Donnelly Dome (Middle Tanana: Łuu Tahwdzeey’, Ahtna: Łuu Tahwdzaeye’) is a summit located west of the Richardson Highway, 18 miles south of Delta Junction, Alaska. The name was established in the 1920s and derived from nearby Donnelly, Alaska, then a telegraph station. Prior to that time it was called "Delta Dome", named after the Delta River.

Donnelly Dome was formed through glaciation that occurred 70,000 to 100,000 years ago. It was completely covered by the glaciers, and was considered a fleigberg, or a mountain covered in ice.

The area around Donnelly Dome is owned by the United States Army as part of the Donnelly Training Area of Fort Wainwright, so hikers are required to register for a Recreation Access Permit before visiting.
