= Thompson Pass =

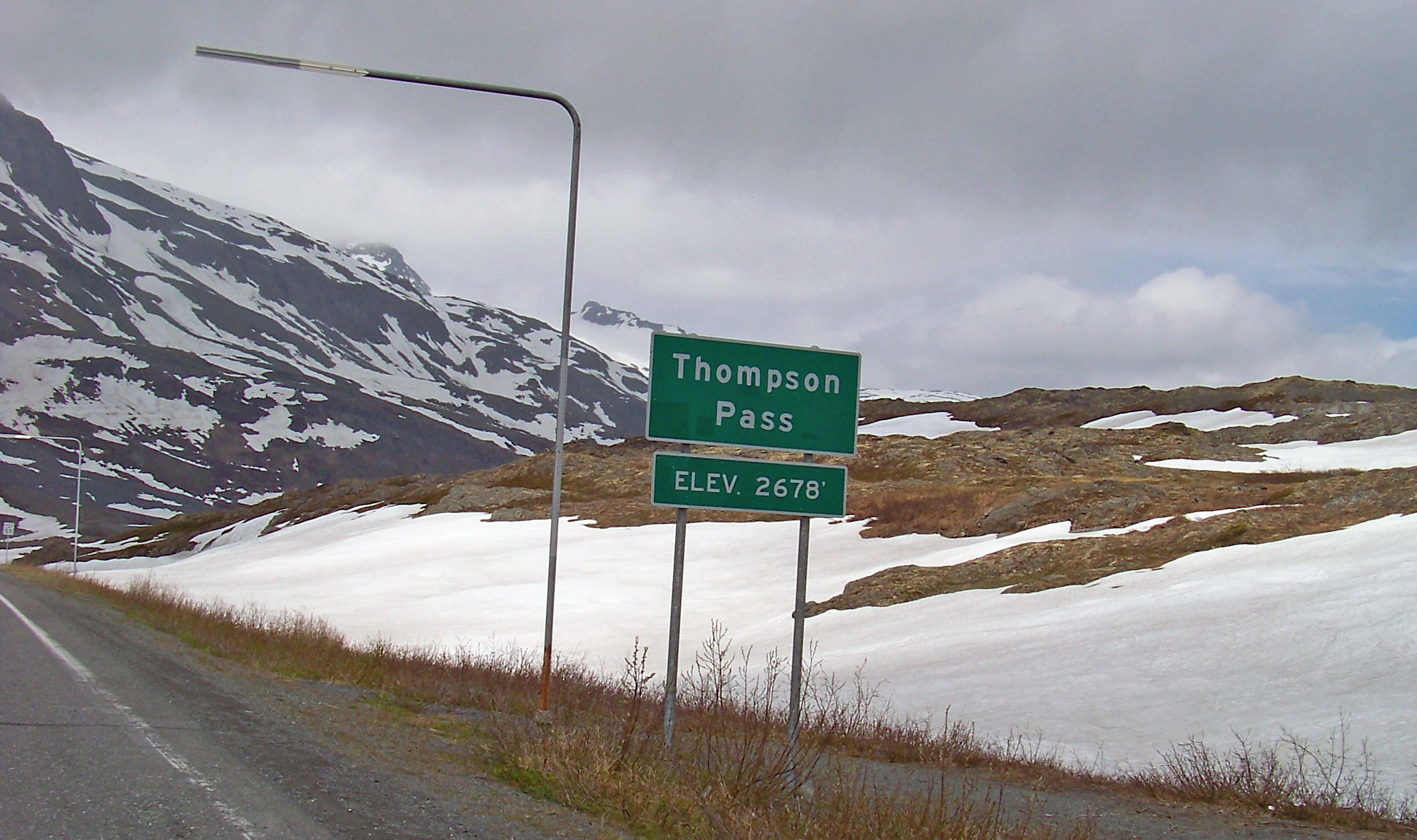
- Thompson Pass, as seen in May 2009.
- Interactive map of Thompson Pass
- Elevation: 2,805 ft (855 m)
- Traversed by: Richardson Highway, Trans-Alaska Pipeline System

Third Approach
- Location: Valdez-Cordova Census Area, Alaska, United States
- Range: Chugach Mountains
- Coordinates: 61°07′43″N 145°43′47″W

Thompson Pass is a 2,678 foot high (816 meter high) gap in the Chugach Mountains northeast of Valdez, Alaska. It is the snowiest weather station in Alaska, recording 500 inches or 13 metres of snow per year on average. In the winter of 1952–1953, 974.1 inches or 25 metres of snow fell—the most ever recorded in one season at one location in Alaska. It is not the most snow ever recorded in one season at one location anywhere in the fifty states as that record belongs to Mount Baker Ski Resort at 1,140 inches or 29 metres in 1998–99. The pass also holds the Alaska record for the most snow in a single day: 62 inches or 1.6 metres fell on December 29, 1955.

The pass was named in 1899 by U.S. Army captain William Abercrombie "in compliment to Hon. Frank Thomson, of Pennsylvania", but he spelled the name "Thompson" on his sketched map, and that spelling stuck. The pass had been used by Alaska Native Ahtna people for generations prior to Abercrombie's arrival, but he marked and defined a trail through the pass for use by Klondike Gold Rush miners. His route, which became the Valdez-Eagle Trail, later was used by the Washington-Alaska Military Cable and Telegraph System, which strung cables through Thompson Pass. The path through the pass continued to be improved, and automobiles first drove the entire length of the trail in 1913. By that point, it had become the Valdez-Fairbanks Trail, and it was renamed the Richardson Road in 1919.

Because of heavy snowfall in Thompson Pass, the Richardson Highway was used only in summer. Not until 1950, when a freight company foreman demonstrated that the pass could be kept open with snowplows, was the road drivable year-round. The trail through the pass remained gravel until 1955, when the Alaska Road Commission (part of the US Department of the Interior) paved it.

== Pipeline construction ==
In the early 1970s, Thompson Pass was the scene of frantic activity as thousands of workers built a portion of the Trans-Alaska Pipeline System from a camp located nearby. Heavy snowfall in the pass slowed work in the winter, but the pipeline was completed by 1977, and oil today flows through the pass on an almost constant basis.

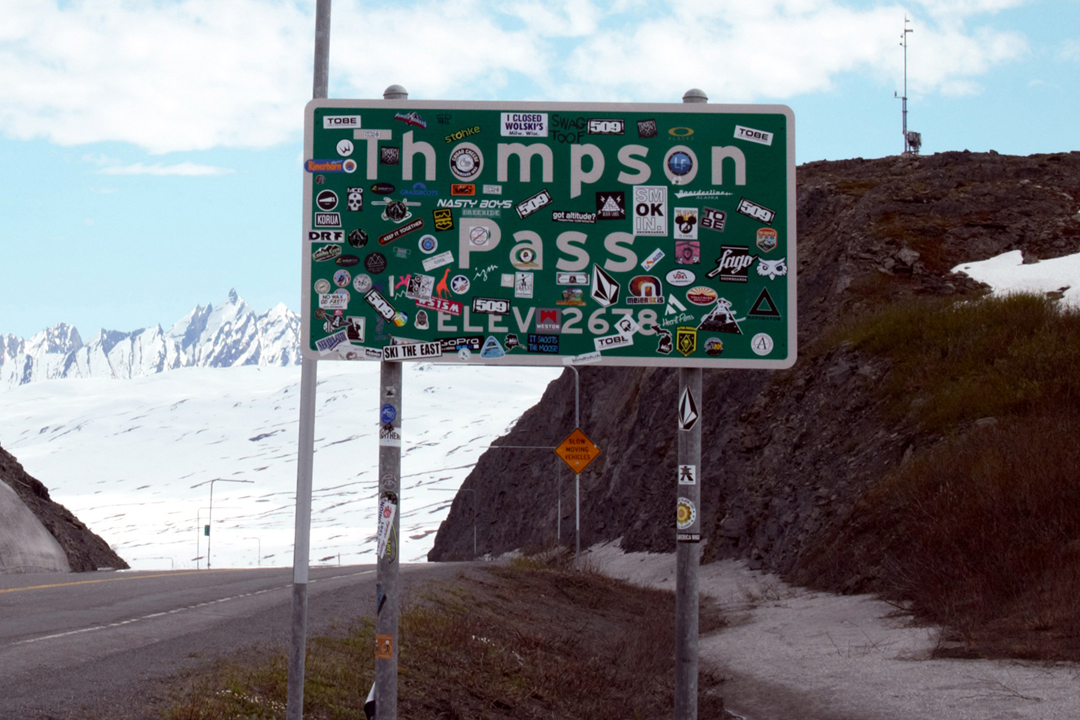
The Valdez bound Thompson Pass sign, as seen in May 2016.

Because Valdez is the southern terminus of the pipeline and Thompson Pass provides the only overland transportation link to Valdez, the state of Alaska maintains a road service station in the pass to keep it plowed and ice-free year-round. This facility includes Thompson Pass Airport, a short landing strip used by state aircraft. The work of keeping the highway through the pass clear is extremely challenging due to weather conditions and was highlighted in the Discovery Channel television special Alaska: Most Extreme.

== Recreation ==
The pass is a popular destination for tourists and adventurers. Heliskiing and snowboarding are popular recreational activities in the winter, and in the summer, hiking and backpacking is commonplace as well. Notable hikes in the summer include Little Odyssey and the Kaden Lake Trail.

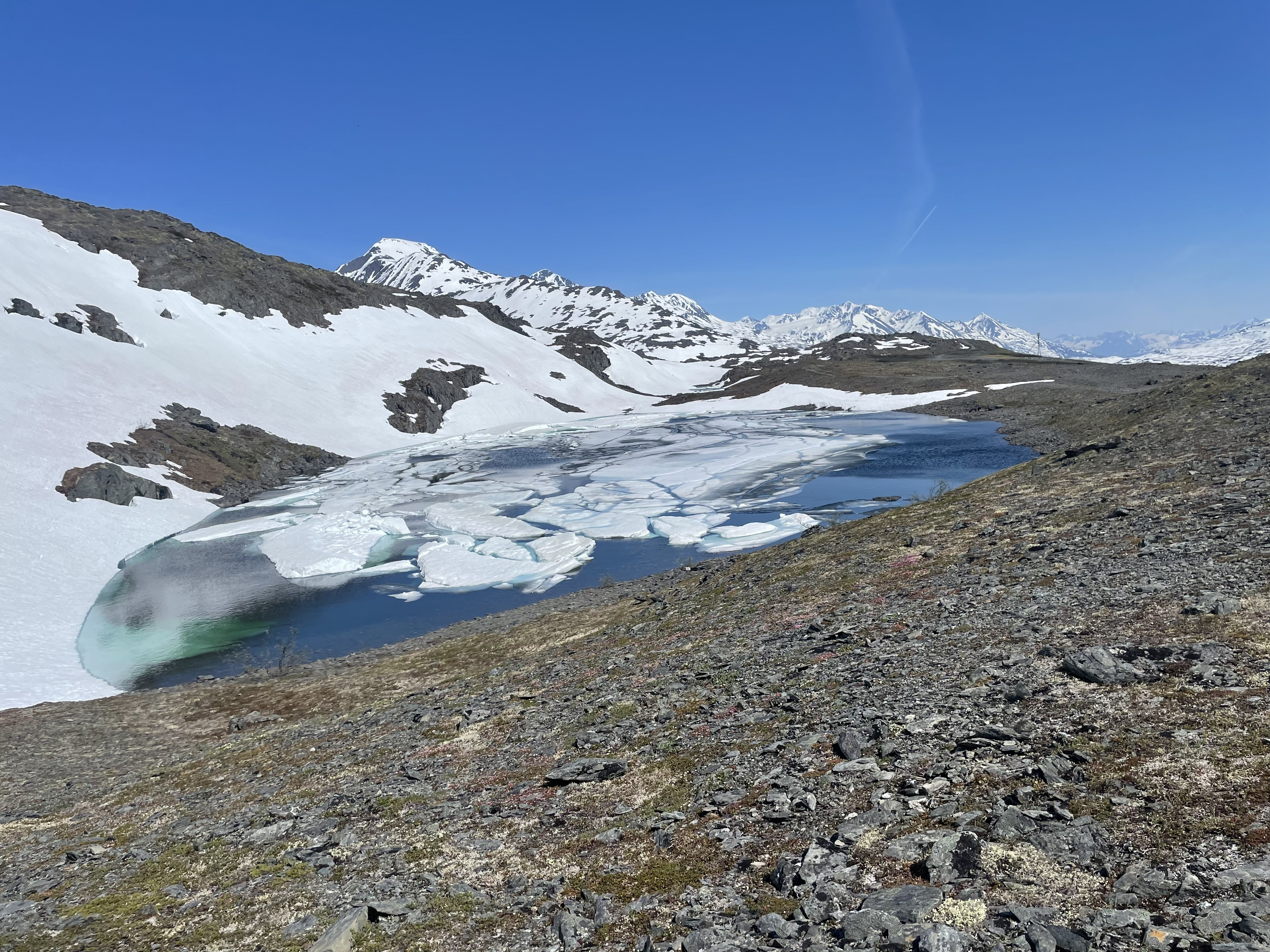
A view of Kaden Lake with Little Odyssey in the background

== Protected areas ==
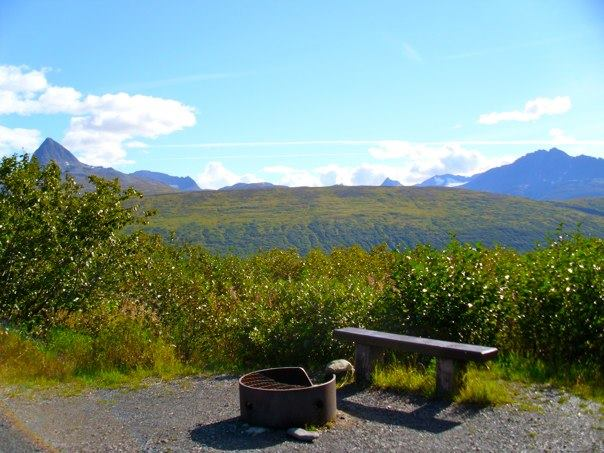
Blueberry Lake is situated on the side of a mountain in the Pass, inside a switchback of the highway.

Blueberry Lake State Recreation Site is a 192 acres (78 ha) park in Thompson Pass. It has a lake with Arctic grayling in it, a campground, and several picnic areas. It has been described as “one of Alaska’s most beautifully situated campgrounds”.

Worthington Glacier State Recreation Site is a 113 acres (46 ha) site with picnic areas, interpretive displays, and trails enabling visitors to approach the glacier.

== Climate ==
Thompson Pass has an alpine tundra climate (ET) with one of the highest snow totals in the world. The Upper Tsaina River SNOTEL weather station is located close to the summit of Thompson Pass at a height of 1750 feet (533 metres).

Climate data for Upper Tsaina River, Alaska, 2004–2020 normals, 1991-2020 precipitation: 1750ft (533m)
Month	Jan	Feb	Mar	Apr	May	Jun	Jul	Aug	Sep	Oct	Nov	Dec	Year
Record high °F (°C)	47 (8)	45 (7)	50 (10)	61 (16)	76 (24)	88 (31)	92 (33)	85 (29)	74 (23)	60 (16)	47 (8)	50 (10)	92 (33)
Mean maximum °F (°C)	37 (3)	39 (4)	42 (6)	52 (11)	65 (18)	77 (25)	80 (27)	76 (24)	67 (19)	52 (11)	37 (3)	38 (3)	78 (26)
Mean daily maximum °F (°C)	12.3 (−10.9)	20.3 (−6.5)	28.5 (−1.9)	42.0 (5.6)	52.7 (11.5)	62.2 (16.8)	66.2 (19.0)	62.9 (17.2)	53.5 (11.9)	38.9 (3.8)	20.8 (−6.2)	16.3 (−8.7)	39.7 (4.3)
Daily mean °F (°C)	4.4 (−15.3)	10.7 (−11.8)	17.5 (−8.1)	31.5 (−0.3)	42.8 (6.0)	51.3 (10.7)	55.7 (13.2)	52.7 (11.5)	44.6 (7.0)	31.8 (−0.1)	13.9 (−10.1)	9.0 (−12.8)	30.5 (−0.8)
Mean daily minimum °F (°C)	−3.7 (−19.8)	1.1 (−17.2)	6.4 (−14.2)	21.0 (−6.1)	32.9 (0.5)	40.4 (4.7)	45.2 (7.3)	42.5 (5.8)	35.5 (1.9)	24.7 (−4.1)	7.0 (−13.9)	1.7 (−16.8)	21.2 (−6.0)
Mean minimum °F (°C)	−30 (−34)	−23 (−31)	−14 (−26)	2 (−17)	25 (−4)	32 (0)	37 (3)	32 (0)	24 (−4)	6 (−14)	−17 (−27)	−23 (−31)	−33 (−36)
Record low °F (°C)	−39 (−39)	−35 (−37)	−25 (−32)	−17 (−27)	16 (−9)	29 (−2)	34 (1)	27 (−3)	12 (−11)	−11 (−24)	−29 (−34)	−34 (−37)	−39 (−39)
Average precipitation inches (mm)	4.30 (109)	3.74 (95)	2.55 (65)	1.03 (26)	1.33 (34)	0.94 (24)	1.77 (45)	3.81 (97)	6.94 (176)	5.24 (133)	4.51 (115)	5.39 (137)	41.55 (1,056)
Source 1: XMACIS2
Source 2: NOAA (Precipitation)

Climate data for Thompson Pass, AK
Month	Jan	Feb	Mar	Apr	May	Jun	Jul	Aug	Sep	Oct	Nov	Dec	Year
Record high °F (°C)	43 (6)	42 (6)	50 (10)	56 (13)	62 (17)	69 (21)	73 (23)	70 (21)	60 (16)	61 (16)	44 (7)	42 (6)	74 (23)
Mean daily maximum °F (°C)	10.3 (−12.1)	18.7 (−7.4)	24.8 (−4.0)	36.7 (2.6)	40.7 (4.8)	54.1 (12.3)	57.7 (14.3)	54.6 (12.6)	46.8 (8.2)	33.7 (0.9)	21.5 (−5.8)	14.1 (−9.9)	34.5 (1.4)
Daily mean °F (°C)	4.8 (−15.1)	13.4 (−10.3)	18.8 (−7.3)	29.7 (−1.3)	33.4 (0.8)	45.2 (7.3)	49.2 (9.6)	48.1 (8.9)	40.1 (4.5)	29.1 (−1.6)	16.8 (−8.4)	8.7 (−12.9)	28.1 (−2.1)
Mean daily minimum °F (°C)	−0.7 (−18.2)	8.9 (−12.8)	12.8 (−10.7)	22.5 (−5.3)	26.1 (−3.3)	36.2 (2.3)	40.7 (4.8)	41.6 (5.3)	33.4 (0.8)	24.4 (−4.2)	12.0 (−11.1)	3.8 (−15.7)	21.8 (−5.7)
Record low °F (°C)	−33 (−36)	−28 (−33)	−29 (−34)	−10 (−23)	0 (−18)	29 (−2)	31 (−1)	20 (−7)	−3 (−19)	−23 (−31)	−39 (−39)	−40 (−40)	−40 (−40)
Average precipitation inches (mm)	6.18 (157)	8.41 (214)	7.11 (181)	6.29 (160)	1.92 (49)	1.32 (34)	4.66 (118)	4.62 (117)	5.93 (151)	10.82 (275)	10.09 (256)	9.89 (251)	77.25 (1,962)
Average snowfall inches (cm)	61.9 (157)	92.1 (234)	65.9 (167)	56.6 (144)	23.1 (59)	0.0 (0.0)	0.0 (0.0)	0.0 (0.0)	8.7 (22)	65.3 (166)	83.1 (211)	94.7 (241)	551.5 (1,401)
Source 1: The Western Regional Climate Center
Source 2: Weatherbase

== See also ==
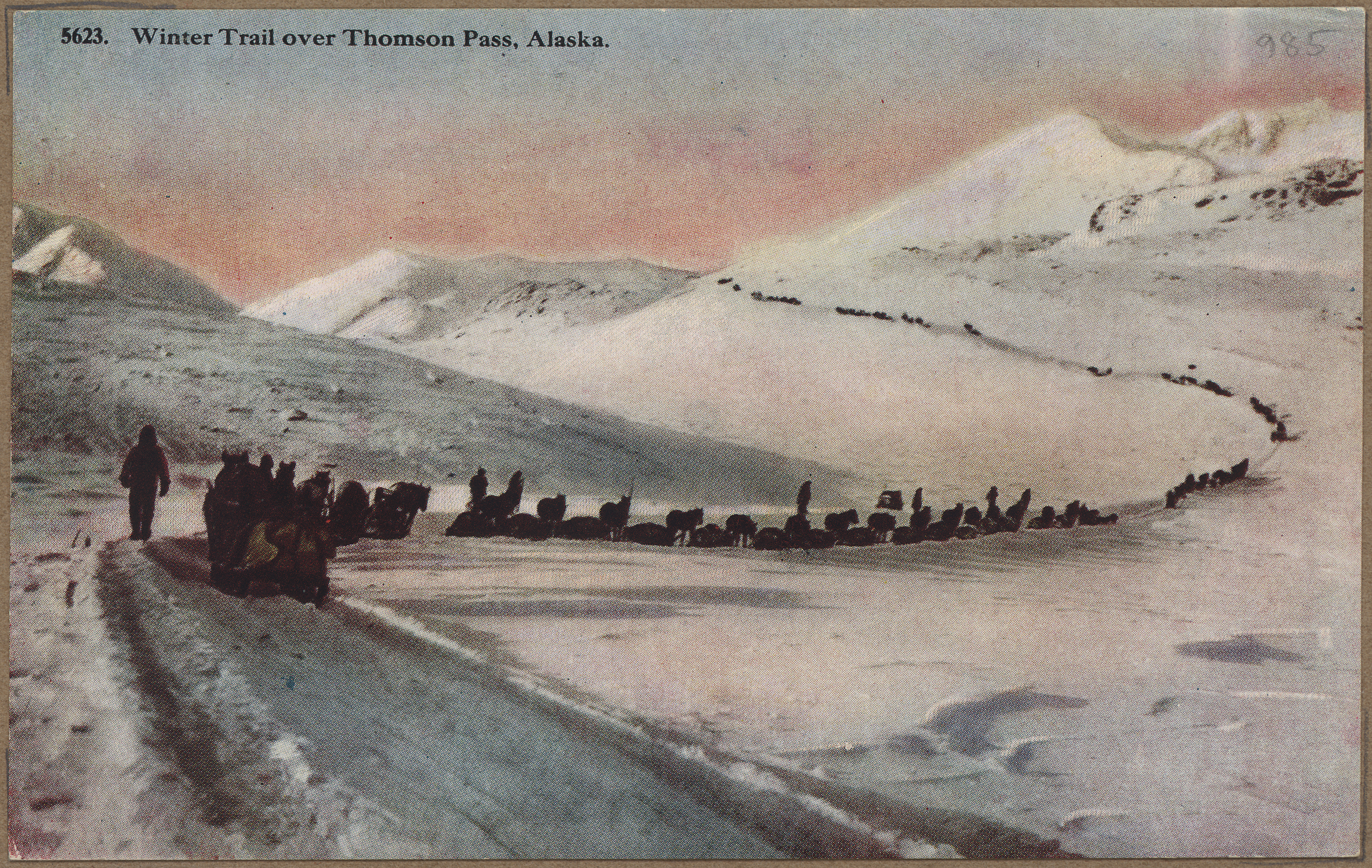
Horse-drawn sleds crossing Thompson Pass in the early years of the 20th Century

- Mount Billy Mitchell (Chugach Mountains)
- Keystone Canyon, which is the route connecting the Pass to Valdez
