= Fort Egbert =

Coordinates: 64.7897°N 141.2139°W

Fort Egbert was a U.S. Army base in Eagle, Alaska. It operated from 1899 to 1911.

== History ==
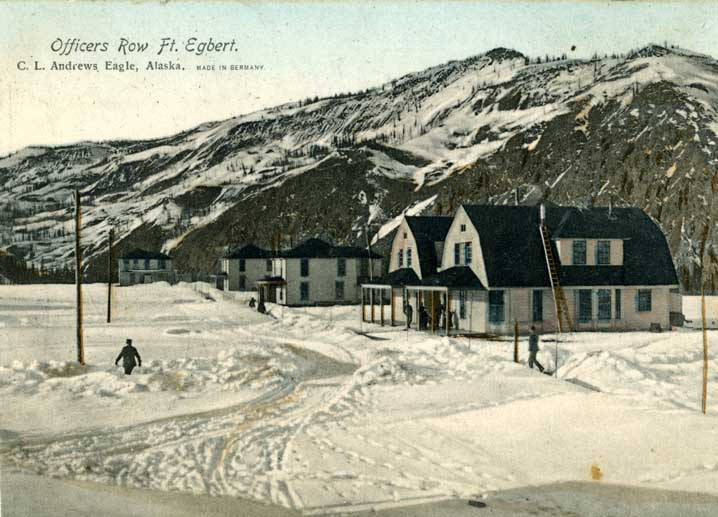
Fort Egbert's "Officers Row" depicted on a postcard

Fort Egbert was established in 1899, during the Klondike Gold Rush, as U.S. Army headquarters in the District of Alaska. It was named by U.S. President William McKinley in honor of Colonel Harry C. Egbert, who died in battle on March 26, 1899 in Manila.

The base was constructed next to Eagle Bluff, a rocky outcropping overlooking Eagle, a Yukon River mining community near the Canada–US border. Eagle, which was established on a military reservation, was placed under the jurisdiction of the new base "until such time as some form of civil government may be established." Eagle was released from martial law on July 23, 1900.

Fort Egbert was designated as the first station in the Washington-Alaska Military Cable and Telegraph System (WAMCATS), a network of telegraph lines connecting Alaska with the contiguous United States. The first link in the system was completed in October 1900, running from Dawson City in the Canadian Yukon Territory to Fort Egbert. Another link, completed August 24, 1902, connected Fort Egbert with Fort Liscum in Valdez.

In 1905, Norwegian explorer Roald Amundsen used Fort Egbert's telegraph station to announce his successful crossing of the Northwest Passage.

Fort Egbert was abandoned in 1911 except for an Army Signal Corps contingent, which continued to operate a station until 1925, when the wireless station (which had replaced the land lines) burned to the ground.

Five buildings of the original Fort Egbert have been preserved under the jurisdiction of the Bureau of Land Management.

== Demographics ==
Historical population
Census	Pop.	Note	%±
1910	198		—

Fort Egbert appeared once on the 1910 U.S. Census as an unincorporated military installation. Owing to its deactivation in 1911, it was not reported again.

== See also ==
- Mount Billy Mitchell (Chugach Mountains)
