= William R. Abercrombie =

United States Army officer

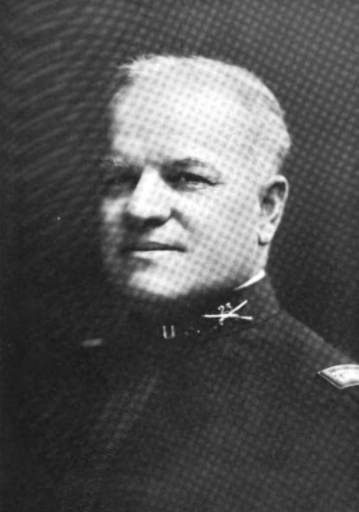
- Born: August 17, 1857; Fort Ridgely, Minnesota Territory
- Died: November 7, 1943 (aged 86); Spokane, Washington
- Occupation: United States Army officer

William R. Abercrombie (August 17, 1857 – November 7, 1943) was a career U.S. Army officer during the late 19th century.

== Biography ==
William R. Abercrombie was born at Fort Ridgely on August 17, 1857. Raised in Long Island, New York, he was appointed a 2nd Lieutenant in the U.S. Army by President U.S. Grant in 1877 and was assigned to the 2nd Infantry. He proceeded to the Pacific coast to join the Nez Perce War. After the war he served in a number of assignments including the Indian Wars, Abercrombie participated in many expeditions in the Northwest and Alaska.

Abercrombie led the 1898 expedition seeking "an all-American route from coastal Alaska to the Klondike." The next year Abercrombie was responsible for constructing a military road to Eagle on the Yukon River.

He died in Spokane on November 7, 1943. Fort Abercrombie in Kodiak, in the Territory of Alaska, was named in his honor.
