= Eagle, Alaska =

Eagle, Alaska Tthee T’äwdlenn
- Hamlet
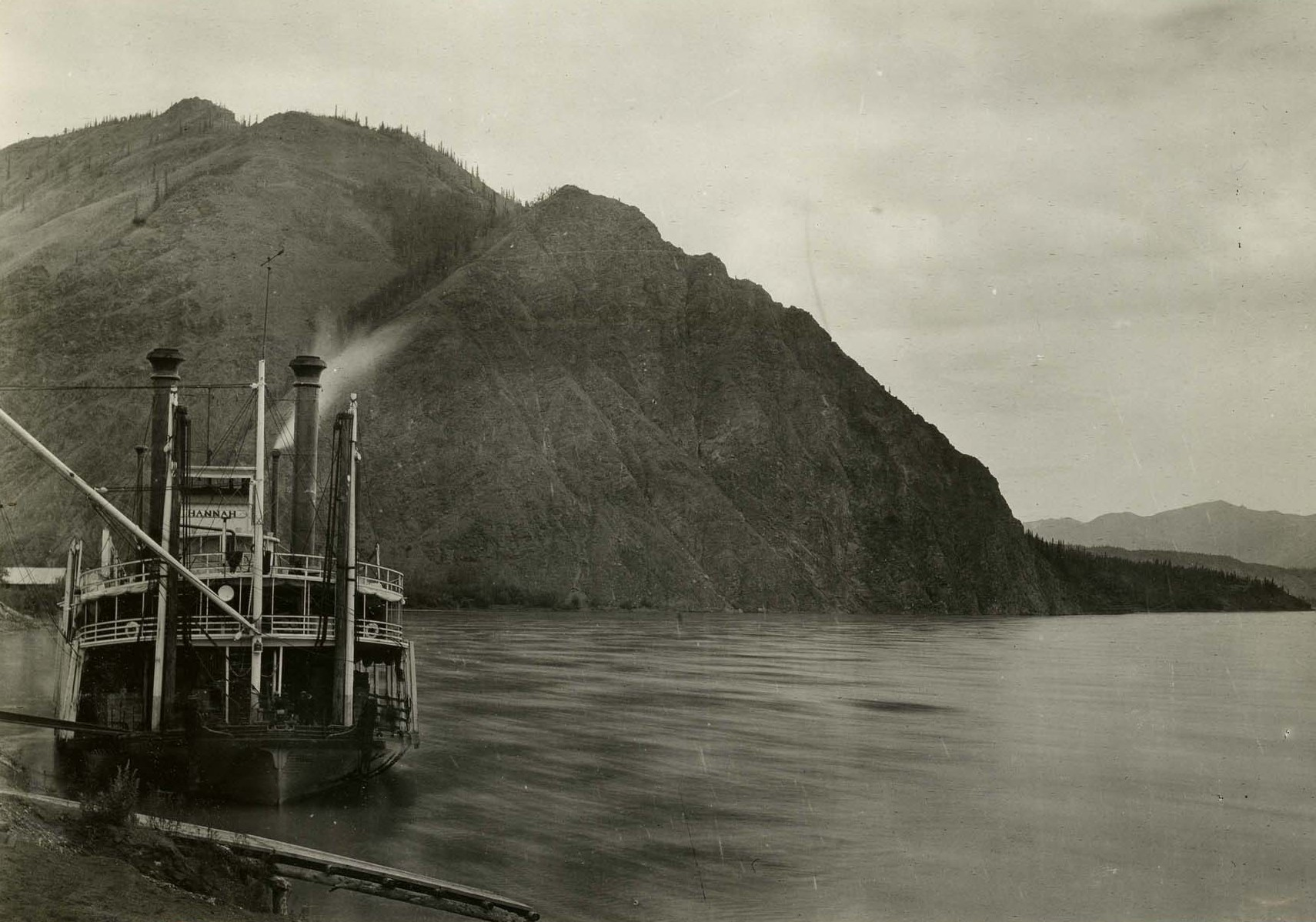
- Steamer Hannah docked at Eagle circa 1900

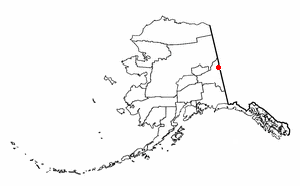
- Location of Eagle, Alaska
- Coordinates: 64°47′15″N 141°12′5″W
- Country: United States
- State: Alaska
- Census area: Southeast Fairbanks
- Incorporated: February 9, 1901

Government
  - Mayor: Daniel Helmer
  - State senator: Mike Cronk (R)
  - State rep.: Rebecca Schwanke (R)

Area
  - Total: 0.88 sq mi (2.28 km^{2})
  - Land: 0.88 sq mi (2.28 km^{2})
  - Water: 0 sq mi (0.00 km^{2})
- Elevation: 850 ft (260 m)

Population (2020)
  - Total: 83
  - Density: 94.2/sq mi (36.36/km^{2})
- Time zone: UTC-9 (Alaska (AKST))
  - Summer (DST): UTC-8 (AKDT)
- ZIP code: 99738
- Area code: 907
- FIPS code: 02-20380
- GNIS feature ID: 1401499

Eagle (Hän: Tthee T’äwdlenn) is a village on the south bank of the Yukon River, near the Canada–US border in the Southeast Fairbanks Census Area in Alaska, United States. It includes the Eagle Historic District, a U.S. National Historic Landmark. As of the 2020 census, Eagle had a population of 83. Every February, Eagle hosts a checkpoint for the long-distance Yukon Quest sled dog race.

== Geography ==
Eagle is located at 64°47′10″N 141°12′0″W (64.786022, -141.199917), in a straight line about 5.9 miles (9.5 km) west of the border between Alaska and the Yukon Territory of Canada at the 141st meridian west.

Eagle is on the southern bank of the Yukon River at the end of the Taylor Highway, near Yukon–Charley Rivers National Preserve.

According to the United States Census Bureau, the city has a total area of 1.0-square-mile (2.6 km^{2}), all land.

== Climate ==
Like most of Alaska, Eagle has a subarctic climate (Köppen Dwc) with long, severely cold, dry winters occasionally moderated by chinook winds, and short, warm summers. In the absence of chinook moderation, winter temperatures can be dangerously cold: in the notoriously cold month of December 1917, the temperature did not rise above −25 °F (−31.7 °C) and it averaged −46 °F (−43.3 °C). When chinooks occur, winter temperatures can get above 32 °F (0.0 °C), doing so on an average of five days per winter.

Climate data for Eagle, Alaska (1991–2020 normals, extremes 1901–present)
Month	Jan	Feb	Mar	Apr	May	Jun	Jul	Aug	Sep	Oct	Nov	Dec	Year
Record high °F (°C)	50 (10)	57 (14)	59 (15)	74 (23)	91 (33)	97 (36)	95 (35)	93 (34)	80 (27)	69 (21)	51 (11)	53 (12)	97 (36)
Mean maximum °F (°C)	30.4 (−0.9)	35.2 (1.8)	44.7 (7.1)	60.6 (15.9)	78.6 (25.9)	86.4 (30.2)	86.8 (30.4)	81.1 (27.3)	68.4 (20.2)	51.1 (10.6)	32.8 (0.4)	32.0 (0.0)	88.6 (31.4)
Mean daily maximum °F (°C)	1.0 (−17.2)	12.0 (−11.1)	23.7 (−4.6)	44.8 (7.1)	61.7 (16.5)	72.2 (22.3)	73.3 (22.9)	66.9 (19.4)	54.6 (12.6)	33.5 (0.8)	12.7 (−10.7)	6.5 (−14.2)	38.6 (3.7)
Daily mean °F (°C)	−7.7 (−22.1)	0.9 (−17.3)	8.7 (−12.9)	29.8 (−1.2)	45.9 (7.7)	56.5 (13.6)	59.2 (15.1)	53.1 (11.7)	42.0 (5.6)	24.7 (−4.1)	4.5 (−15.3)	−2.1 (−18.9)	26.3 (−3.2)
Mean daily minimum °F (°C)	−16.4 (−26.9)	−10.2 (−23.4)	−6.4 (−21.3)	14.8 (−9.6)	30.2 (−1.0)	40.8 (4.9)	45.0 (7.2)	39.3 (4.1)	29.4 (−1.4)	15.8 (−9.0)	−3.7 (−19.8)	−10.8 (−23.8)	14.0 (−10.0)
Mean minimum °F (°C)	−50.4 (−45.8)	−43.2 (−41.8)	−33.9 (−36.6)	−9.7 (−23.2)	19.8 (−6.8)	33.5 (0.8)	37.9 (3.3)	28.6 (−1.9)	17.1 (−8.3)	−5.7 (−20.9)	−29.4 (−34.1)	−41.0 (−40.6)	−53.2 (−47.3)
Record low °F (°C)	−71 (−57)	−67 (−55)	−58 (−50)	−30 (−34)	−1 (−18)	20 (−7)	25 (−4)	18 (−8)	−7 (−22)	−37 (−38)	−54 (−48)	−69 (−56)	−71 (−57)
Average precipitation inches (mm)	0.34 (8.6)	0.25 (6.4)	0.18 (4.6)	0.32 (8.1)	0.94 (24)	1.81 (46)	2.80 (71)	1.87 (47)	1.39 (35)	0.77 (20)	0.43 (11)	0.38 (9.7)	11.48 (291.4)
Average snowfall inches (cm)	8.0 (20)	8.0 (20)	6.1 (15)	3.1 (7.9)	1.0 (2.5)	0.0 (0.0)	0.0 (0.0)	0.0 (0.0)	1.3 (3.3)	11.1 (28)	12.1 (31)	12.0 (30)	62.7 (157.7)
Average precipitation days	6.7	4.2	3.9	4.4	9.4	11.6	16.6	15.1	11.2	8.1	6.5	7.8	105.5
Average snowy days (≥ 0.1 in)	5.6	4.9	3.8	1.9	0.6	0.0	0.0	0.0	0.9	6.3	7.5	7.1	38.6
Source 1: NOAA (snow/snow days 1981–2010)
Source 2: National Weather Service

== History ==
For thousands of years prior to Europeans arriving in Alaska, the Eagle area was home to many indigenous peoples, including the Han.

The first known American-built structure in Eagle was a log trading post called "Belle Isle", erected around 1874. Subsequently, in the late 1800s, Eagle became a supply and trading center for miners working the upper Yukon River and its tributaries. By the year 1898, Eagle's population had exceeded 1,700 persons; many newcomers journeyed to the area with word of the Klondike Gold Rush.

In 1901, Eagle became the first incorporated city of the Alaska Interior. It was named for the many eagles that nested on nearby Eagle Bluff. A United States Army camp, Fort Egbert, was built at Eagle in 1900. A telegraph line between Eagle and Valdez was completed in 1903. In 1905, Roald Amundsen arrived in Eagle and telegraphed the news of the Northwest Passage to the rest of the world.

The ensuing gold rushes in Nome and Fairbanks eventually lured people away from Eagle. In 1903, Judge James Wickersham moved the Third Division court from Eagle to Fairbanks. By 1910, Eagle's population had declined to its present-day level, below 200 people. Fort Egbert was abandoned in 1911.

Present-day Eagle is home to (mostly) people of European descent; nearby Eagle Village has a small population that is about 50 percent Han.

The town enjoyed some notoriety, as the setting of John McPhee's book Coming into the Country, first published in 1977 and becoming quite popular. Many of the buildings from the Gold Rush years are preserved as part of the Eagle Historic District, a National Historic Landmark district.

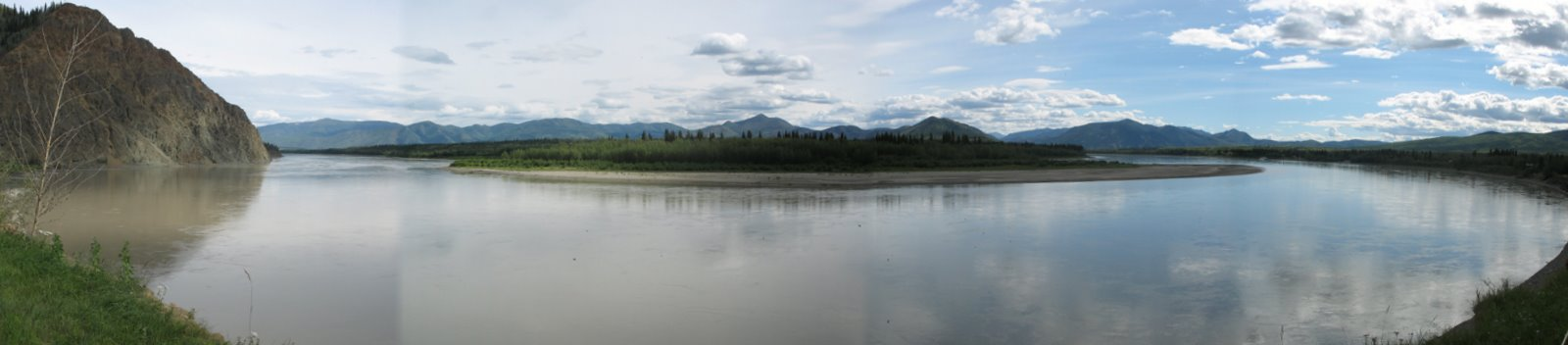
Yukon River at Eagle, 2006

The Eagle area also is one of the locales featured on the National Geographic Channel series Life Below Zero.

== Demographics ==
Historical population
Census	Pop.	Note	%±
1900	383		—
1910	178		−53.5%
1920	98		−44.9%
1930	54		−44.9%
1940	73		35.2%
1950	55		−24.7%
1960	92		67.3%
1970	36		−60.9%
1980	110		205.6%
1990	168		52.7%
2000	129		−23.2%
2010	86		−33.3%
2020	83		−3.5%
U.S. Decennial Census

Eagle first appeared on the 1900 U.S. Census as Eagle City, although it was not incorporated until the following year. It was shortened to Eagle in the following census.

=== 2020 census ===
As of the 2020 census, Eagle had a population of 83. The median age was 59.3 years. 8.4% of residents were under the age of 18 and 41.0% of residents were 65 years of age or older. For every 100 females there were 112.8 males, and for every 100 females age 18 and over there were 105.4 males age 18 and over.

0.0% of residents lived in urban areas, while 100.0% lived in rural areas.

There were 45 households in Eagle, of which 11.1% had children under the age of 18 living in them. Of all households, 44.4% were married-couple households, 24.4% were households with a male householder and no spouse or partner present, and 26.7% were households with a female householder and no spouse or partner present. About 42.2% of all households were made up of individuals and 26.7% had someone living alone who was 65 years of age or older.

There were 136 housing units, of which 66.9% were vacant. The homeowner vacancy rate was 2.6% and the rental vacancy rate was 75.5%.

Racial composition as of the 2020 census
Race	Number	Percent
White	81	97.6%
Black or African American	0	0.0%
American Indian and Alaska Native	0	0.0%
Asian	0	0.0%
Native Hawaiian and Other Pacific Islander	0	0.0%
Some other race	0	0.0%
Two or more races	2	2.4%
Hispanic or Latino (of any race)	1	1.2%

=== 2000 census ===
As of the 2000 census, there were 129 people, 58 households, and 37 families residing in the city. The population density was 127.9/sq mi (49.4/km^{2}). There were 137 housing units at an average density of 135.8 units per square mile (52.4 units/km^{2}). The racial makeup of the city was 93.02% White, 6.20% Native American, and 0.78% from two or more races. 0.78% of the population were Hispanic or Latino of any race.

Of the 58 households, 20.7% had children under the age of 18 living with them, 55.2% were married couples living together, 6.9% had a female householder with no husband present, and 36.2% were non-families. 34.5% of all households were made up of individuals, and 5.2% had someone living alone who was 65 years of age or older. The average household size was 2.22 and the average family size was 2.86.

In the city the population was spread out, with 24.8% under the age of 18, 3.1% from 18 to 24, 24.0% from 25 to 44, 44.2% from 45 to 64, and 3.9% who were 65 years of age or older. The median age was 44 years. For every 100 females there were 95.5 males. For every 100 females age 18 and over, there were 98.0 males.

The median income for a household in the city was $36,042, and the median income for a family was $44,375. Males had a median income of $30,000 versus $20,000 for females. The per capita income for the city was $20,221. There were 2.6% of families and 16.5% of the population living below the poverty line, including 40.0% of under eighteens and none of those over 64.

== Notable person ==
- Charlie Fisher, baseball player

== Education ==
In the 1970s, high school-aged children took correspondence courses from the University of Nebraska–Lincoln, with a local resident supervising their work. Eagle is now part of the Alaska Gateway School District. Eagle School, a K–12 campus, serves city students.

== Eagle Historic District ==
- Eagle Historic District
- U.S. National Register of Historic Places
- U.S. National Historic Landmark District
- Alaska Heritage Resources Survey
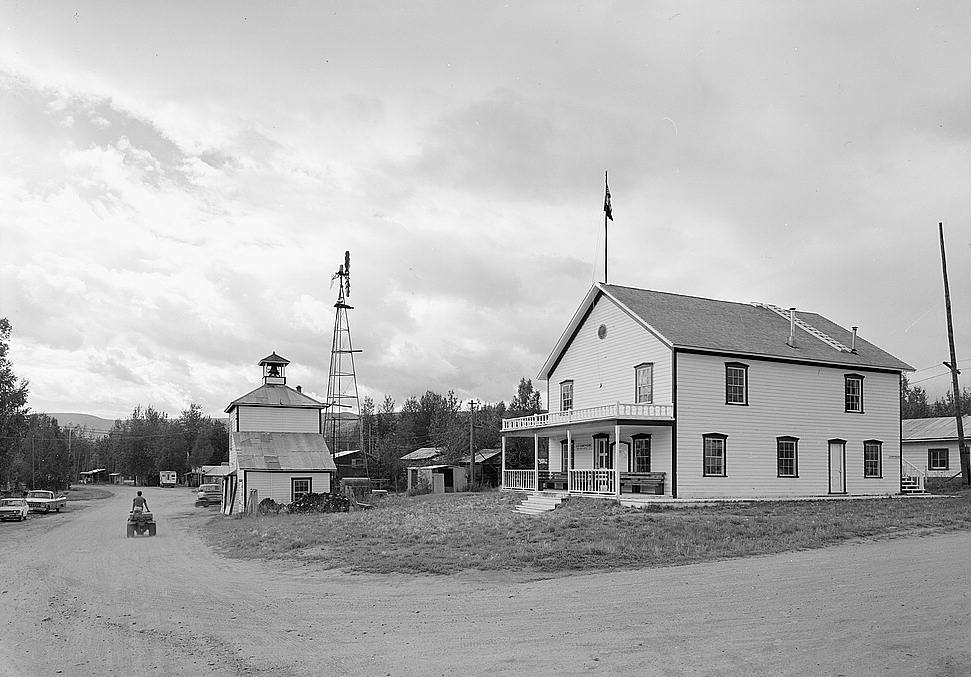
- The former federal courthouse

- Location within Alaska
- Location: Roughly the town of Eagle and the area of Fort Egbert
- Coordinates: 64°47′28″N 141°12′56″W
- Area: 2,400 acres (970 ha)
- Built: 1898
- NRHP reference No.: 06000435
- AHRS No.: EAG-001

Significant dates
- Added to NRHP: October 27, 1970
- Designated NHLD: June 2, 1978

The Eagle Historic District is a well-preserved example of the historic development in Northern Alaska. Fort Egbert was built in 1889 to serve a central governmental role for the area. Over 100 buildings from this era survive including the Federal courthouse which was funded by fines enacted against the rowdy inhabitants. The district was added to the National Register of Historic Places on October 27, 1970 and was designated as a National Historic Landmark on June 2, 1978.

== See also ==
- List of National Historic Landmarks in Alaska
- National Register of Historic Places listings in Southeast Fairbanks Census Area, Alaska
