= Lachapelle =

Lachapelle may refer to:

== Places ==
- Lachapelle, Lot-et-Garonne
- Lachapelle, Meurthe-et-Moselle
- Lachapelle, Somme
- Lachapelle, Tarn-et-Garonne

== People with the surname ==
- Andrée Lachapelle (1931–2019), French Canadian actress
- David LaChapelle (born 1963), American photographer, music video director and film director
- Dolores LaChapelle (1926–2007), American mountaineer, skier, Tai chi teacher and independent scholar
- Edward LaChapelle (1926–2007), American avalanche researcher, glaciologist, mountaineer, skier, author and professor
- Émile Lachapelle (1905–1988), Swiss rowing coxswain and sailor
- Emmanuel-Persillier Lachapelle (1845–1918), Canadian physician
- Gérard Lachapelle, Canadian engineer
- Huguette Lachapelle (1942–2021), Canadian politician
- Katie Lachapelle (born 1977), American ice hockey player and coach
- Marie-Louise Lachapelle (1769–1821), French midwife
- Sean LaChapelle (born 1970), American football wide receiver
- Séverin Lachapelle (1850–1913), Canadian physician, educator, and political figure

== See also ==
- Chapelle (disambiguation)
