= Chapelle (surname) =

Chapelle or LaChapelle is a French surname. Notable people with the surname include:

- Corinne Chapelle (1976–2021), French American violinist
- David LaChapelle (born 1963), photographer and director
- Dickey Chapelle (1918–1965), photojournalist and war correspondent
- Dolores LaChapelle (1926–2007), deep ecologist
- Edward LaChapelle (1926–2007), avalanche forecaster, mountaineer, skier, author, and professor
- Jean de La Chapelle (1651–1723), French writer and dramatist
- Howard I. Chapelle (1901–1975), maritime historian
- Marie-Louise Lachapelle (1769–1821), pioneering French midwife

== See also ==
- Chappelle
