= Chapelle =

Chapelle or La Chapelle may refer to:

== Communes in France ==
- La Chapelle, Allier
- La Chapelle, Ardennes
- La Chapelle, Charente
- La Chapelle, Savoie
- Les Chapelles, Savoie department
- La Chapelle (Seine), a former commune of Paris

== Other places ==
- Église de la Chapelle or Kapellekerk, a church in Brussels
- Quartier de La Chapelle, a neighborhood of Paris, France
- La Chapelle (Paris Metro), a metro station in Paris, France
- Porte de la Chapelle (Paris Metro), a metro station in Paris, France
- Sainte-Chapelle, a Gothic chapel on the Île de la Cité, Paris, France
- La Chapelle, Artibonite, a commune in Artibonite department, Haiti
- La Chapelle, a commune of Plan-les-Ouates, Switzerland
- Chapelle, Glâne, a former municipality of the canton of Fribourg, Switzerland
- Archbishop Chapelle High School, a high school in New Orleans, United States
- Aix-la-Chapelle or Aachen, Germany

== Other uses ==
- La Chapelle (Church), a Baptist Evangelical multi-site church based in Montreal, Canada.
- Chapelle (surname)
- Chapelle Jewellery, a brand of jewellery retailer F.Hinds
- de la Chapelle syndrome, a genetic disorder

== See also ==
- Chappelle (disambiguation)
- Lachapelle (disambiguation)
- La Chapelle (Seine)
