= Girls Mountain =

Mountain in Alaska, United States

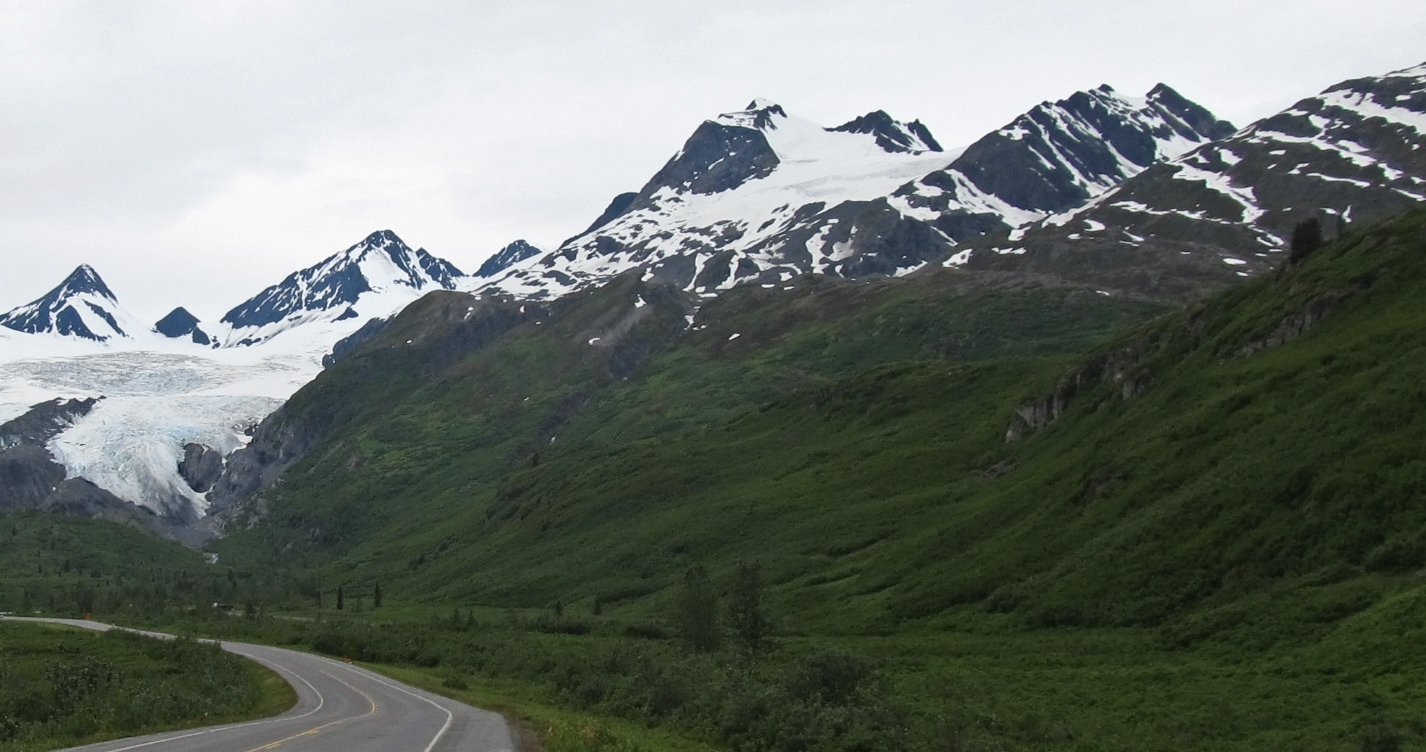
- Girls Mountain centered, from the east. (Worthington Glacier to left)

Highest point
- Elevation: 6,134 ft (1,870 m)
- Prominence: 934 ft (285 m)
- Isolation: 1.85 mi (2.98 km)
- Coordinates: 61°10′55″N 145°46′32″W

Geography
- Location within Alaska
- Interactive map of Girls Mountain
- Location: Chugach Census Area; Alaska, United States
- Parent range: Chugach Mountains
- Topo map: USGS Valdez A-5

Climbing
- First ascent: 1957

Girls Mountain is a 6,134-foot (1,870 m) glaciated mountain summit located in the Chugach Mountains, in the U.S. state of Alaska. The peak is situated 18 mi (29 km) east of Valdez, 4 mi (6 km) north-northwest of Thompson Pass, and 2 mi (3 km) west of the Richardson Highway. Precipitation runoff from the mountain and meltwater from its glaciers drains into tributaries of the Tsina River, which in turn is part of the Copper River drainage basin.

== History ==
The Girls Mountain toponym was officially adopted in 1964 by the U.S. Board on Geographic Names after being named in 1963 by Austin Post of the United States Geological Survey. The name was suggested by the International Geophysical Year benchmark, "Station Girls, 1957", cemented into the mountain's bedrock summit. The first ascent of the peak was made in 1957 by Austin Post and USGS party who placed the benchmark.

== Climate ==
Based on the Köppen climate classification, Girls Mountain is located in a subarctic climate zone with long, cold, snowy winters, and cool summers. Winter temperatures can drop below −20 °C with wind chill factors below −30 °C. This climate supports the Tsina and Worthington Glaciers surrounding the mountain. The months May through June offer the most favorable weather for viewing and climbing.

== Gallery ==
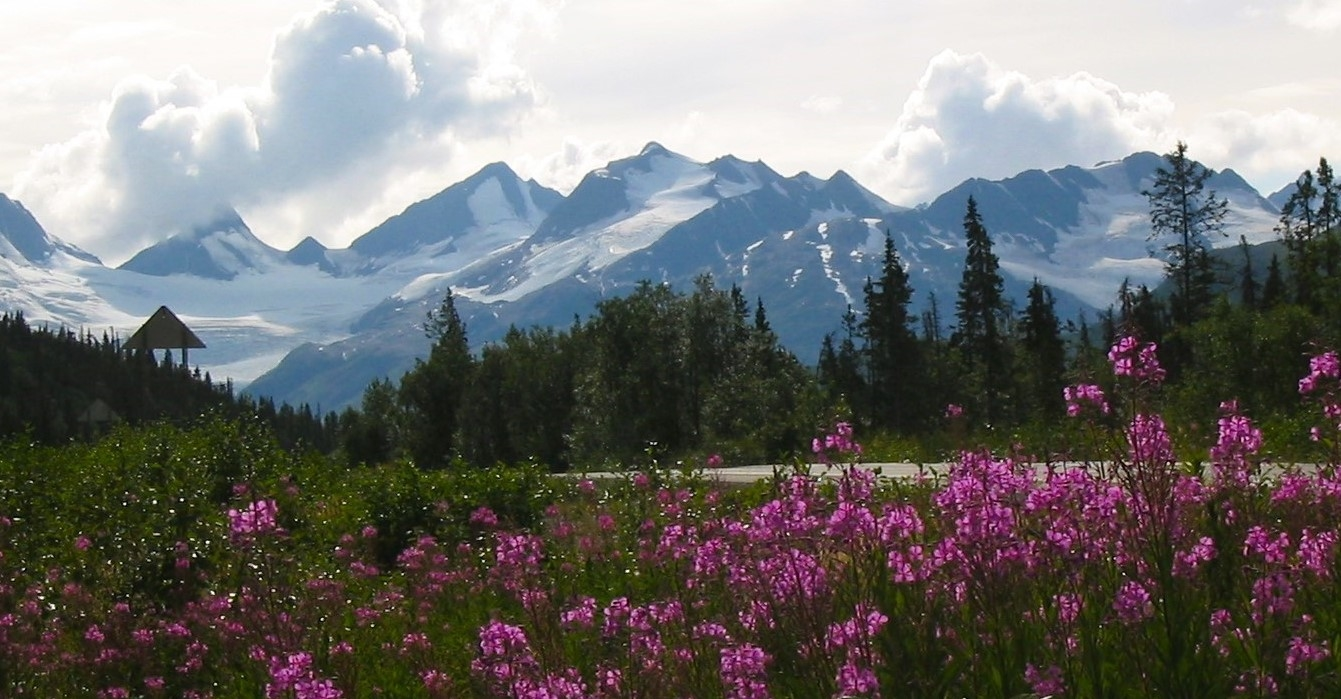
Girls Mountain centered

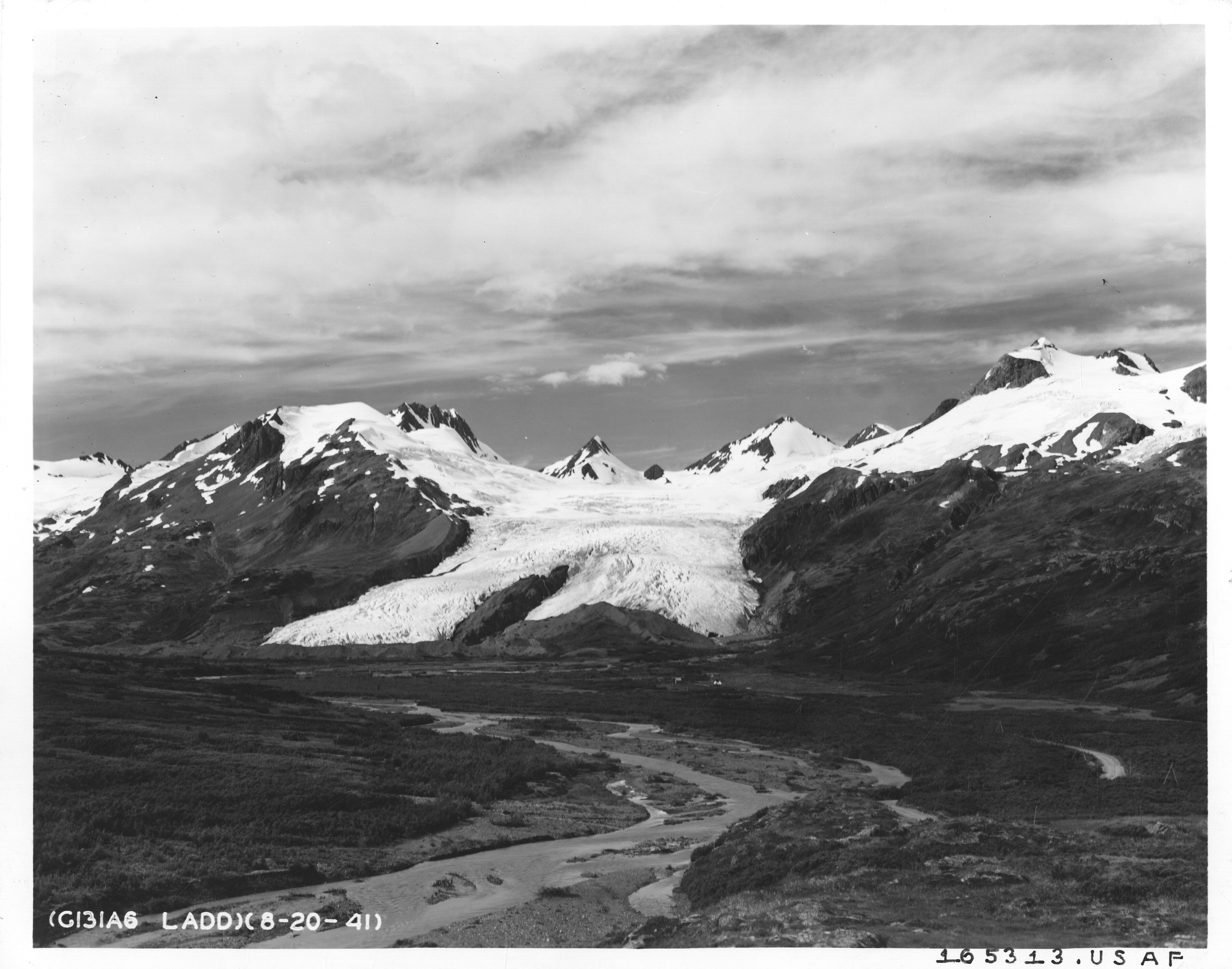
Girls Mountain (right) and Worthington Glacier

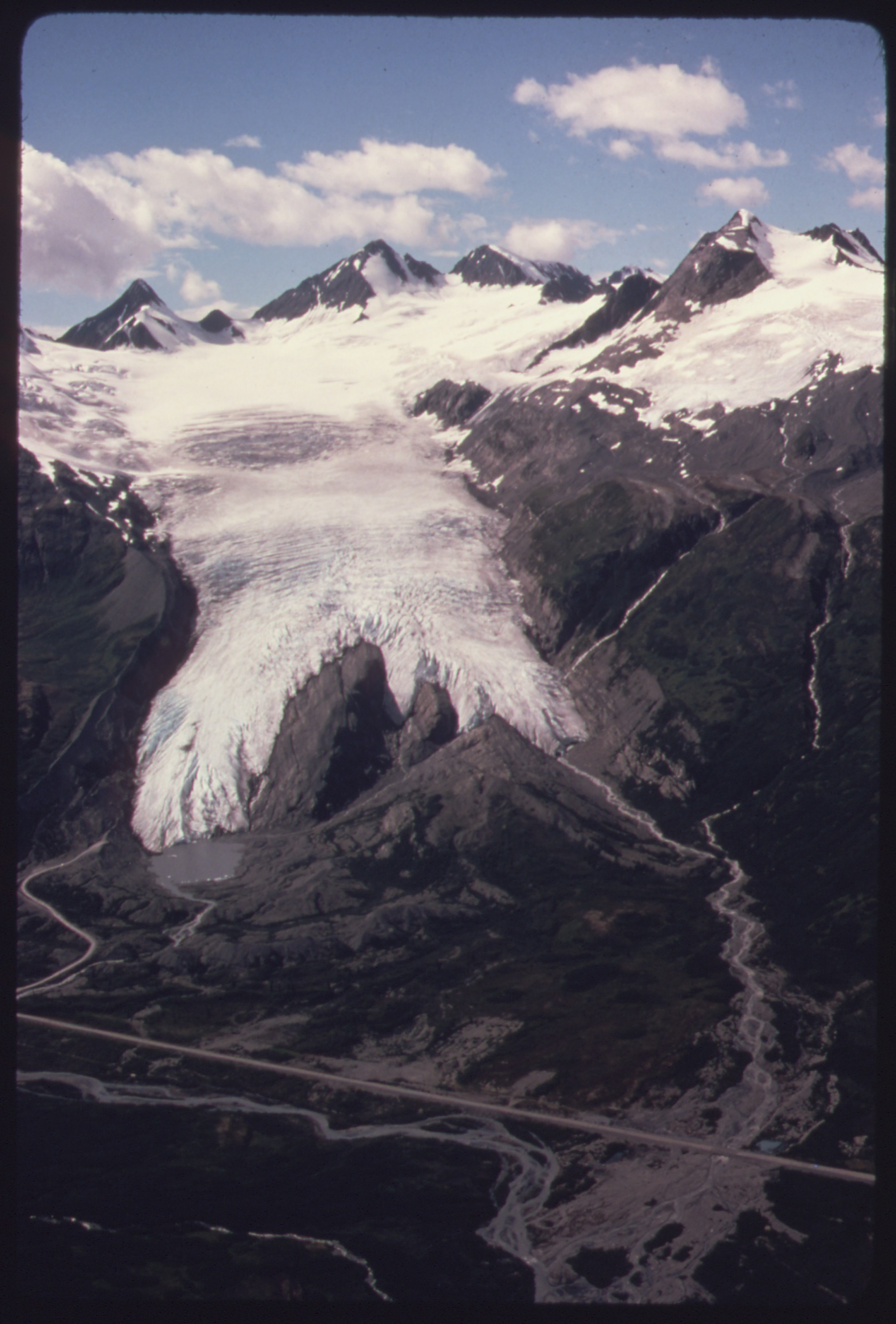
Girls Mountain at upper right

== See also ==
- List of mountain peaks of Alaska
- Geography of Alaska
