= Seine (department) =

Former department of France encompassing Paris and its suburbs

Coordinates: 48°51′N 2°21′E

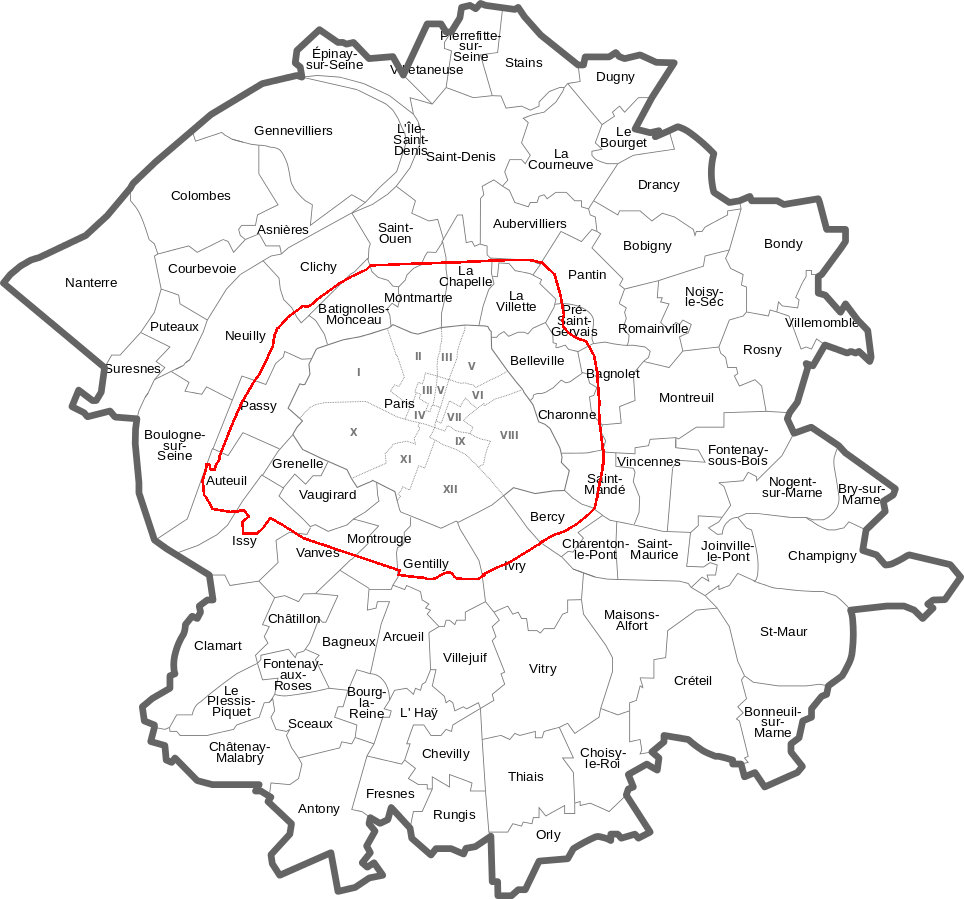
Seine and its communes before the 1860 enlargement of the City of Paris, with the red links marking the enlargement

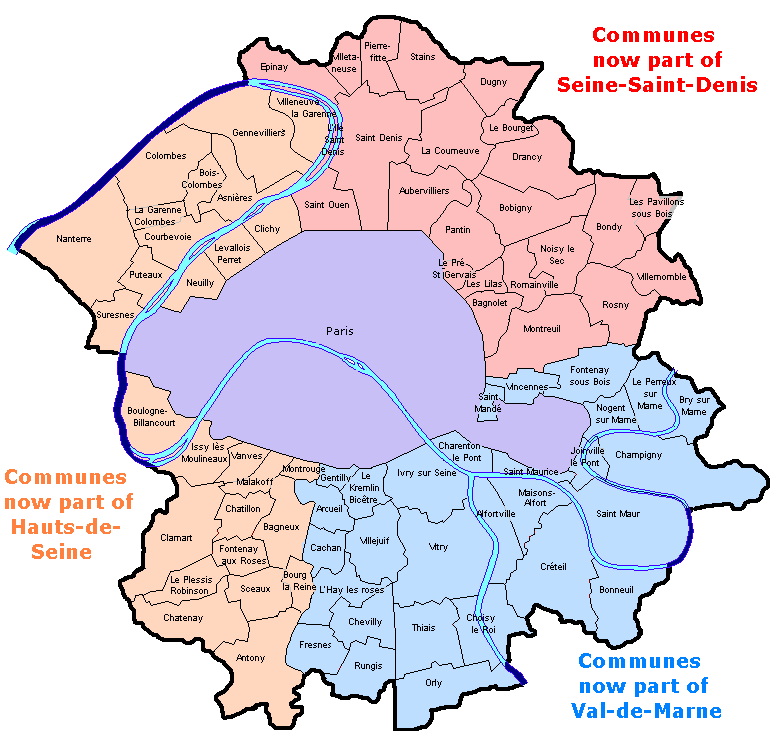
Seine and its 81 communes as it existed between 1929 and 1968. The City of Paris, enlarged several times between 1860 and 1929, is now considerably larger in area. Colours show how the department was split in 1968.

Seine (French: [sɛn]) is a former department of France (1795–1968), which encompassed Paris and its immediate suburbs. Named after the river Seine which flowed through it, it was the only enclaved department of France, being surrounded entirely by the former Seine-et-Oise department.

Its prefecture was Paris; its INSEE number was 75 (now Paris). When the Seine department was disbanded its territory was divided among four new departments: Paris, Hauts-de-Seine, Seine-Saint-Denis and Val-de-Marne.

== General characteristics ==
From 1929 to its abolition in 1968, the department consisted of the City of Paris and 80 surrounding suburban communes. It had an area of 480 km^{2} (185 sq. miles), 22% of that area being the City of Paris and 78% being suburbs. It was the only enclaved department in France. It was divided into three arrondissements: Paris, Sceaux and Saint-Denis.

For most of the Seine department's existence, its prefect also exercised direct authority over the City of Paris as well. For all but 14 months after 1794, Paris was the only commune without a mayor; it had theoretically less autonomy than the smallest village.

== History ==
=== Formation ===
Shield

Seine was created on 4 March 1790, as the department of Paris (département de Paris). In 1795, it was renamed as the department of Seine (département de la Seine) after the river Seine flowing through it.

At the first census of the French Republic in 1801, the Seine department had 631,585 inhabitants (87% of them living in the City of Paris, 13% in the suburbs) and was the second most populous department of the vast Napoleonic Empire (behind Nord), more populous than even the dense departments of what is now Belgium and the Netherlands.

With the growth of Paris and its suburbs over the next 150 years, the population of the Seine department increased tremendously.

=== Dissolution ===
The former department of Seine shaded darker within the slightly larger Petite Couronne of four post-1968 departments: Paris (75), Hauts-de-Seine (92), Seine-Saint-Denis (93) and Val-de-Marne (94). The mid shade is the former Seine-et-Oise, also split up in 1968; the light shade at the eastern (right) edge is Seine-et-Marne, unchanged in 1968.

By 1968 it contained 5,700,754 residents (45% of them living in the City of Paris, 55% in the suburbs), making it by far the most populous department of France. It was considered that the Seine department was now too large to be governed effectively. On 1 January 1968, it was split into four smaller departments: Paris, Hauts-de-Seine, Seine-Saint-Denis and Val-de-Marne. The latter three also include parts of the former Seine-et-Oise department, which was also abolished at the same time.

The breakup of the Seine department involved the following changes:

- The city (commune) of Paris was turned into a department in its own right, with no other communes inside this department. The official number 75 which was used for the Seine department was given to the new Paris department.
- To the south and southeast of the city, 29 communes of the Seine department were grouped with 18 communes of the Seine-et-Oise department to form the new Val-de-Marne department. The official number 94 was assigned to this department, a number previously used for the Territoires du Sud territory in the Saharan part of French Algeria.
- To the west of Paris, 27 communes of the Seine department were grouped with nine communes of Seine-et-Oise to form the new Hauts-de-Seine department. The official number 92 was assigned to this department, a number previously used for the department of Oran in French Algeria.
- Finally, to the north and northeast the 24 remaining communes of the Seine department were grouped with 16 communes of the Seine-et-Oise department to form the new Seine-Saint-Denis department. The official number 93 was assigned to this department, a number previously used for the department of Constantine in French Algeria.

Taken together, Hauts-de-Seine, Val-de-Marne and Seine-Saint-Denis are known in France as the Petite Couronne (meaning "small ring"), as opposed to the Grande Couronne ("large ring") of the more distant suburbs. The Petite Couronne plus the City of Paris total 762 square kilometres (294 sq mi), more than the former Seine department (480 square kilometres, 190 sq mi).

The Métropole du Grand Paris, an administrative structure created in 2016, comprises Paris and the three departments of the Petite Couronne, plus seven additional communes in the Grande Couronne.

== Demographics ==
At the 2006 census, the population of the communes that had previously comprised the Seine department was 5,496,468. The population of the department peaked in 1968 at 5,700,754. It then lost inhabitants until 1999 (with a nadir of 5,203,818 inhabitants at the 1999 census) as residents increasingly relocated to the more distant suburbs of the metropolitan area of Paris, but since 1999 it has regained some inhabitants, with a population increase of 292,650 inhabitants between 1999 and 2006. This new population growth after a long period of decline is comparable to what is observed in the central areas of other large Western metropolises such as Inner London.

Of the new departments created in 1968, Paris was the most populous in 2006 with 2,181,371 inhabitants. The Paris department is currently the second-most populous of France behind that of Nord.

== See also ==
- Departments of France
- La Chapelle (Seine)
