= Chappelle =

Chappelle is a surname of French origin, a variant of the word chapelle meaning "chapel". Notable people with the name include:

- Bill Chappelle (1881–1944), American baseball player
- Charles W. Chappelle (1872–1941), African-American aviation pioneer
- Dave Chappelle (born 1973), American comedian, actor, and social commentator
- Joe Chappelle, American producer and director
- Julius Caesar Chappelle (1852–1904), African-American legislator
- Pat H. Chappelle (1869–1911), African-American founder of the Rabbit's Foot Company vaudeville show
- William D. Chappelle (1857–1925), church minister and formerly enslaved African-American

In fiction

- Ryan Chappelle, a character played by Paul Schulze on 24

== See also ==
- Chappelle's Show, a sketch comedy series starring Dave Chappelle
- Chappelle and Stinnette Records, a small independent United States record label of the early 1920s
- Chappelle, Edmonton, a neighborhood of Edmonton, Canada
- Chapelle (disambiguation)
- Chapelle (surname)
