= La Chapelle (Seine) =

Former commune of the Seine department

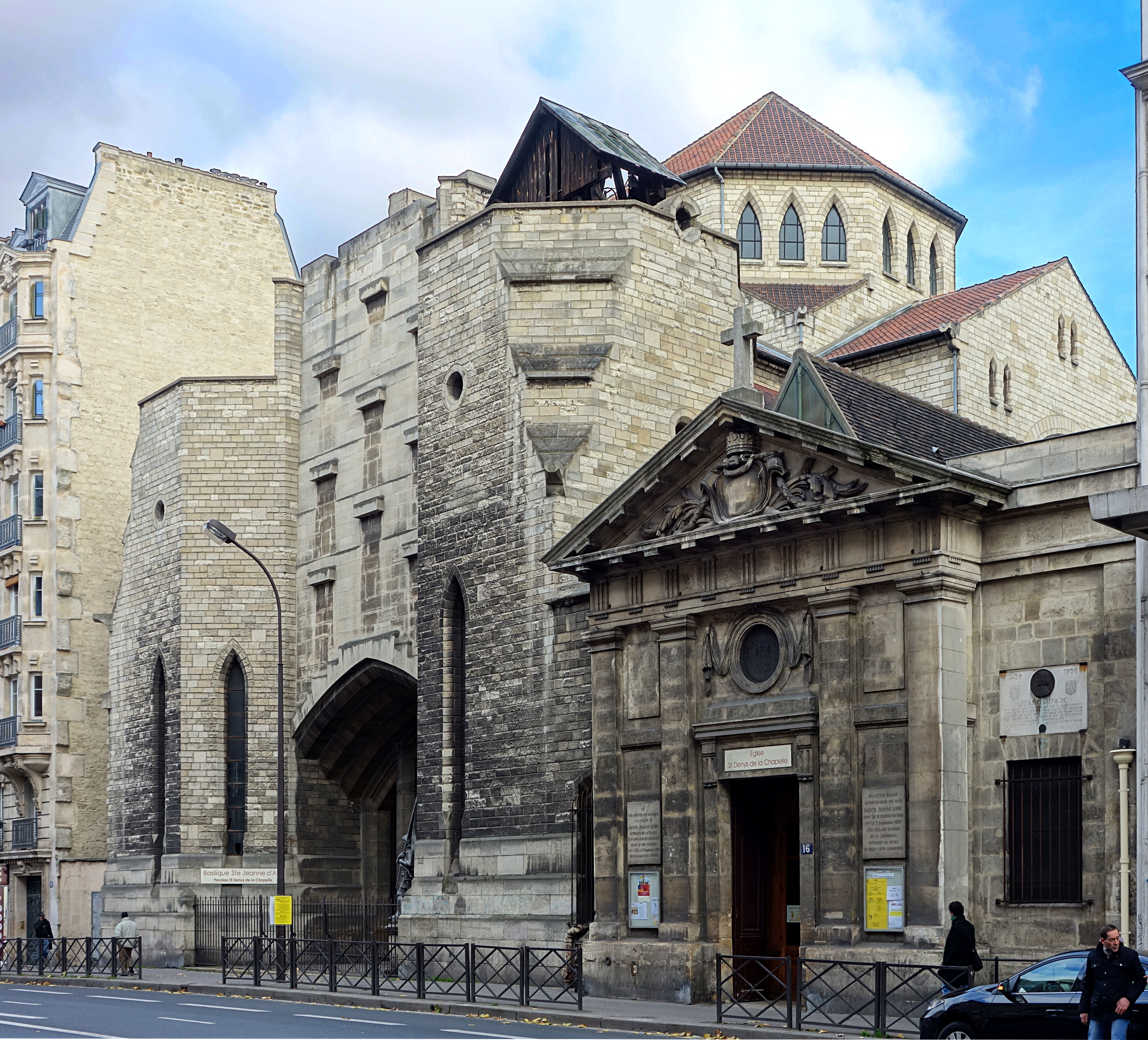
- Saint-Denys de la Chapelle church and Sainte-Jeanne-d'Arc basilica in Paris

- Location: France

La Chapelle (French pronunciation: [la ʃapɛl]) is a former commune of the Seine department, which existed from 1790 to 1860 before being incorporated into Paris, France. It was called "La Chapelle-Franciade" during the French Revolution. It is sometimes called "La Chapelle-Saint-Denis" or "La Chapelle-Sainte-Geneviève".

The village of La Chapelle lies on a natural pass between the hills of Montmartre and Belleville, on the ancient road linking Lutetia to the north, where Saint Geneviève decided to build an oratory in honor of Saint-Denis. For centuries, it was the scene of the processions of the kings of France who left to wage war in the northern lands or, later, to be buried in the abbey of Saint-Denis, as well as those of the monarchs of the north who entered Paris in peace or war. As a result, the town's commercial and craft activities turned to trades linked to this busy thoroughfare: innkeepers, wheelwrights, and blacksmiths. Beyond the road, however, the fields and plains supplied the capital with fruit and vegetables, wheat and oats, and, thanks to the few vines on the Goutte d'Or or other suitable land. This wine gave its name to this hamlet located to the southwest, outside the parish of La Chapelle. Several markets and fairs followed one another, giving the village its reputation, including the famous Lendit fair and cattle market.

The bailliage of La Chapelle, dependent on Saint-Denis, administered the seigneury from the Middle Ages until the Revolution, with rights of justice, police, and tithe collection. Often devastated by frequent assaults on Paris, both during the Wars of Religion and the Fronde, in 1429 the village was the starting point for Joan of Arc's unsuccessful attempt to liberate Paris. From the 17th century onwards, its "guinguettes" (dance halls) gave it a new appeal.

In 1790, the Convention annexed the Goutte d'Or and the faubourg de Gloire to the parish to form the commune of La Chapelle. In January 1791, the so-called Massacre de La Chapelle took place there, causing quite a stir in Paris.

In the first half of the 19th century, urban transformation began, with the massive arrival of people who had come to work in Paris but were too poor to afford housing. The new Northern and Eastern railroads built between 1843 and 1846, and their associated workshops and depots rapidly replaced the fields.

As the government could not control the spontaneous growth of the Paris conurbation, Baron Haussmann proposed the absorption of the capital's outlying communes. La Chapelle was largely integrated into the new 18th arrondissement of Paris, created in 1860, with the north divided between Saint-Denis, Saint-Ouen, and Aubervilliers, marking the end of any autonomous municipal life and the disappearance of the village as such.

== Geographical location ==
=== Parish ===
Limits for the commune of La Chapelle applied to the 2015 plan.

From the beginning of the 14th century, the village of La Chapelle-Saint-Denis was concentrated around and to the south of the church of Saint-Denys. Its approximate boundaries are;:

- to the north, chaussée de Montmartre (now rue Marcadet), Chemin de la Tournelle (now rue Riquet) and the neighborhood around the church;
- to the east, chemin des Vertus (today rue d'Aubervilliers);
- to the south, a line joining Chemin du Bailly (today Boulevard Barbès), leaving the Goutte-d'Or district;
- to the west, Chemin de la Marée (today rue des Poissonniers).

=== Commune ===
The commune of La Chapelle borders Montmartre, Saint-Ouen, Saint-Denis, Aubervilliers, La Villette and two of the twelve urban arrondissements of Paris:

- the former 3rd arrondissement of Paris (Faubourg-Poissonnière district);
- the former 5th arrondissement of Paris (Faubourg-Saint-Denis district).

It is bounded:

- to the west by rue des Poissonniers, which separates it from the commune of Montmartre;
- to the east by rue d'Aubervilliers, which separates it from the commune of La Villette;
- to the north, by Chemin de la Procession and the former boundaries with the communes of Saint-Denis and Aubervilliers, which are difficult to identify today due to the development of rail and industrial infrastructures in the Plaine Saint-Denis area;
- to the south, the Boulevard de la Chapelle, then the Fermiers Généraux wall, connected to Paris via the Poissonnière, Saint-Denis (Note: Also known as barrière de La Chapelle.) and Vertus barriers.
- At the time of its construction, Thiers' enceinte divided the commune of La Chapelle from bastion no. 32 to bastion no. 34.

== Toponymy ==
What was probably originally a simple oratory dedicated to Saint Denis since the 5th century was transformed into a chapela 1 and the village took the name of Chapelle Sainte-Geneviève (Capella S Genovesae according to the Pouillé de Paris of the 13th century). As the village was at the center of a seigneury belonging to the Abbey of Saint-Denis, it was also known as Chapelle Saint-Denis, and the two names were used interchangeably until the seventeenth century. (Note: The form "La Chapelle-les-Paris" appeared in an address to the Convention by the commune's inhabitants on November 19, 1793.) A document from 1351 reads Chapelle-Saint-Denis-en-Eudon, and in the 15th century, Chapelle Ostran.

After the municipality asked to be called La Réunion, or even La Réunion-Franciade, the village was finally renamed Chapelle-Franciade in 1794. (Note: Franciade was the revolutionary name given to the town of Saint-Denis at the time.) The commune soon reverted to the name of La Chapelle.

== History ==
=== Antiquity and the early Middle Ages ===
This small town grew up on a pass between the hills of Montmartre and Belleville called Pasellus Sancti Martini, then Pas-de-la-Chapelle.

500 meters wide at an altitude of around 53 meters, the Col de La Chapelle was the easiest route between the Beauceron and Picardy plains. It has been an important crossing point since ancient times. The route, later known as the Estrée, is mentioned in the Peutinger Table and Antonin's Itinerary. This road followed the axis of today's Rue Marx-Dormoy and Rue de la Chapelle. The village was at the junction of this road with the old tin route linking the English Channel and the North Sea to the Rhone valley (now rue Philippe-de-Girard), without passing through Lutèce. To the north, the plain between Pas-de-la-Chapelle and Saint-Denis (today's Plaine Saint-Denis) was an important Gallic cultic center and the Druids held their summer solstice gatherings around a tumulus considered to be the tomb of the ancestor of the Gauls. It took the name of Endit, then, by agglutination of the article, Lendit. The Gallic assemblies mentioned by Julius Caesar continued to meet under Roman rule. After Caesar, who chose this sacred site to assert his domination over the Gallic tribes, several emperors understood the symbolic significance of this sanctuary: Constantine went there, convinced that he had been invested with a divine mission by Apollo, and Julian had himself proclaimed Auguste. These cult gatherings were also a commercial event, and later became the internationally renowned Lendit fair, held along the Estrée.

As far back as Roman times, there was probably a small village on the Col de La Chapelle, between the wooded hills of Montmartre and Belleville, close to a temple dedicated to Bacchus. Although no archaeological remains have been found, 9th-century documents mention the ruins of a Roman tower known as "Glaucin's prison ". (Note: Jacques-Antoine Dulaure considers the prison mentioned by Grégoire de Tours, the Carcer glaucini also mentioned by the anonymous author of Gesta Dagoberti, to be located on the Île de la Cité, on the site of the Quai des Fleurs, while Jaillot (Jean-Baptiste-Michel Renou de Chevigné dit Jaillot) places it near the Saint-Merri arch, versus sanctus Medericum.) According to Hilduin, abbot of Saint-Denis, the saint was imprisoned here before his martyrdom.

==== The chapel of Saint Geneviève ====
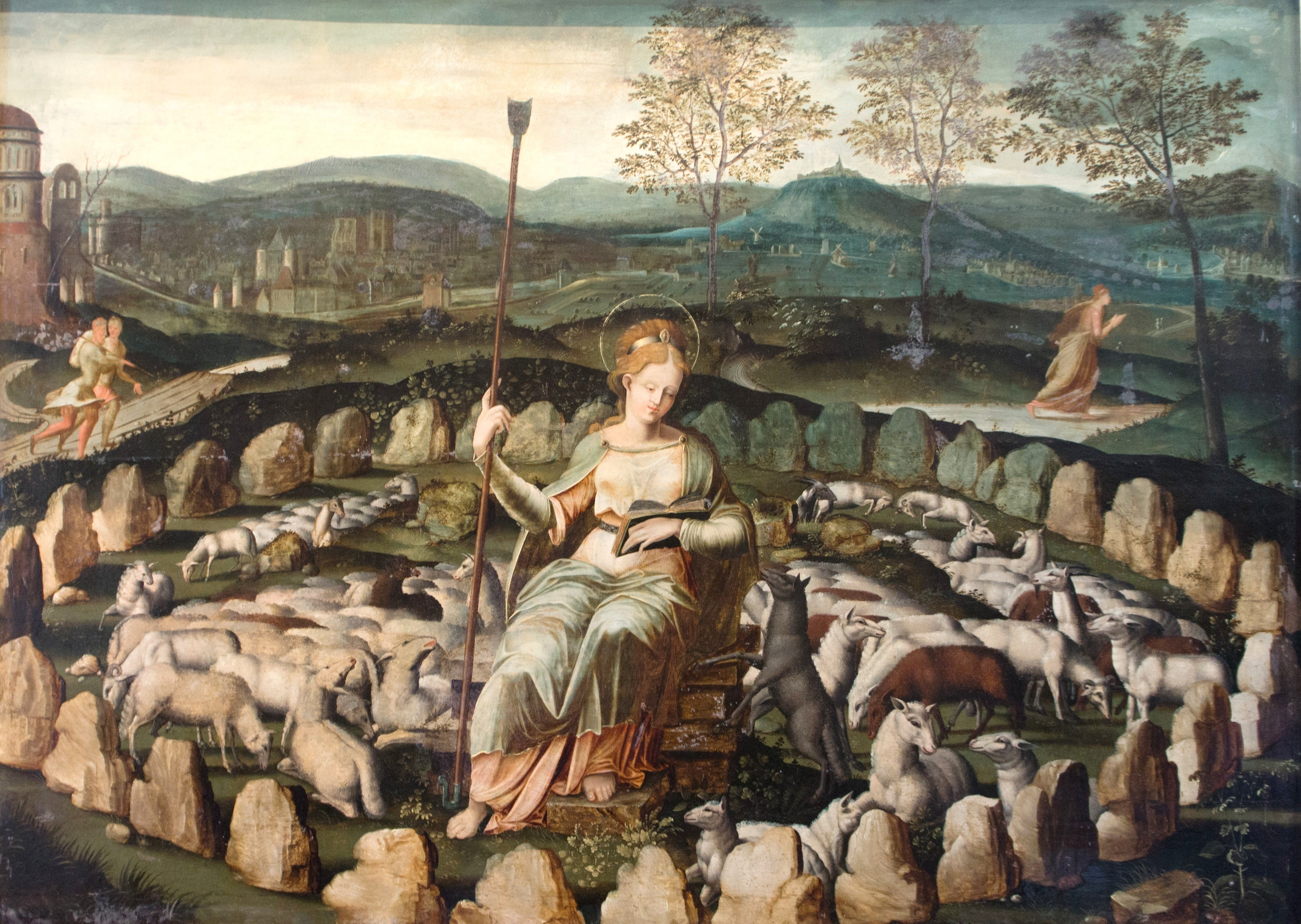
Sainte Geneviève au Lendit, anonymous painting from the 16th century. Seated in the center of a cromlech with her black divinatory sheep to her left, she is depicted as a shepherdess.

Around 475, Saint Geneviève is said to have had the coffin of Saint-Denis transferred to build a burial site for him. Despite the reluctance of the Parisian clergy to build a church outside the city walls, she succeeded in convincing several priests, in particular a certain Genesius, who undertook the construction of the basilica on the model of a sand-and-lime, basilical-plan church, with nave and aisles separated by a double row of columns, with a structure probably of wood on masonry foundations. The tombs of the three martyrs, Denis, Rusticus and Eleuthera, were located behind the altar, which was richly decorated in the 16th century with silk, gold and jewels. The first basilica built by Geneviève over the tomb of Saint-Denis, near the site of his martyrdom, was also intended to exorcise the local paganism through Christian worship.

The village grew up around the church as early as the 6th century. Parisians organized large processions to La Chapelle, particularly during Rogations. The tomb had a great reputation: miracles were performed there, and people came to purge themselves of accusations. In 583, Dagobert, son of Chilperic I and Frédégonde, was buried here, having died in infancy - the only known princely burial at this site.

Cultural and commercial development

As in pre-Christian times, the place of worship polarized a commercial space. A market was held at Marcadus, which gave its name to rue Marcadet. The village activity around the church was linked to pilgrimages: roses were grown to make rosaries, but also vigne. Clotaire II and his son Dagobert had a particular devotion to the saint, which a ninth-century legend explains by the miracle of the stag who, during a hunt, protected the animal that had taken refuge in the church of La Chapelle, and Dagobert's dream, which prevented the young prince from being reprimanded while asleep in the chapel. Around 620-630, the relics were transferred to the royal abbey of Saint-Denis. Depending on the source, they are attributed to King Clothaire on April 22, 627, or to Dagobert I on April 22, 636. From the ninth century onwards, the abbots, by building up the legend of Saint Denis, according to which he carried his head to the town of Saint-Denis, sought to make people forget the location of the martyr's original tomb and the small church of Saint Geneviève. The precious objects that richly decorated the chapel, donated by kings and private individuals, were even moved to Saint-Denis. It was also argued, to perfect this new legend, that the building, now a "miserable little house", painstakingly erected by Saint Geneviève, had in fact been no more than a stopover on her way to pray at Saint-Denis.

But the village's prosperity was ensured by the Lendit fair, which endured, with the church remaining a rallying point for merchants, despite the absence of devotion to the relics. Another fair, known as "de Saint-Denis", was held near the Pas-de-La-Chapelle (Note: From the 11th to the 11th century, this church was known as Saint-Denis-de-l'Estrée before this name was applied to the church that succeeded the monastery of Saint-Denis, and then to the church built by Viollet-le-Duc in 1867.) church in October, on the anniversary of the saint's death. However, the abbots of Saint-Denis succeeded in obtaining a ruling from Pepin le Bref in 759 in favor of transferring the fair to a purpose-built stone hall within the city walls of Saint-Denis, thanks to a forged document allegedly issued by Dagobert. La Chapelle was plundered, ravaged and burned several times by the Normans in the ninth century, then, in the following century, according to Flodoard's chronicle, devastated by the Hellequin mesnie, a terrible army of demons and ghosts, who threw blocks of stone at the church of La Chapelle. (Note: This troupe of fantastic spirits led by a certain Hellequin was more likely a band of looters, or even the hurricane that devastated the vineyards of Montmartre and La Chapelle in 944.)

For centuries, the road from Paris to the royal abbey hosted processions: monarchs from the north on their way to the capital, or the kings of France, on the occasion of their coronation or burial. Its popularity increased at the end of the ninth century, with the construction of the new Grand Pont, the first fortified bridge to provide the only crossing of the Seine's main arm15 for several centuries, and to protect the route between the Île de la Cité and the abbey of Saint-Denis from the brutality of invasions. It also formed part of the Paris crossroads, which Philippe Auguste ordered to be paved up to the village's northern exit. The old Roman road from Lyon, which became less frequented, became known as the Chemin des Potences, as it passed over a small mound (known as the Potences) where the royal gallows was located, before its transfer to Montfaucon in 1189.

=== Middle Ages ===
==== Creation of the parish ====
In the 12th century, pilgrims began to arrive from north-eastern Europe (Flanders, Germany, etc.), heading for Santiago de Compostela via the rue du Faubourg-Saint-Denis to take the Turonensis. The extraordinary growth of the Lendit fair, which depended on Parisian and royal authority and gradually eclipsed that of Saint-Denis, benefited the development of La Chapelle. Abbot Suger had a diploma approved by his friend Louis VI in 1124, based on an alleged translation of the fair from Aix-la-Chapelle, where it was said to have been created by Charlemagne, to the site of Lendit by Charles the Bald in 877, to guarantee the abbey ownership and revenues of the fair. To the south, between the village and Philippe Auguste's enclosure, the vast marshlands began to be drained and cultivated.

In 1229, an abbot of Saint-Denis named Odon granted a charter of franchise to the inhabitants. With the erection of the church of Saint-Denys on the site of the former wooden chapel in 1204, and the creation of a curacy, the village became a parish of the seigneury of Saint-Denis, and took the name of La Chapelle Saint-Denis. The facade was built at the end of the 13th century, and decorated with sculptures evoking the presence of Saint Geneviève.

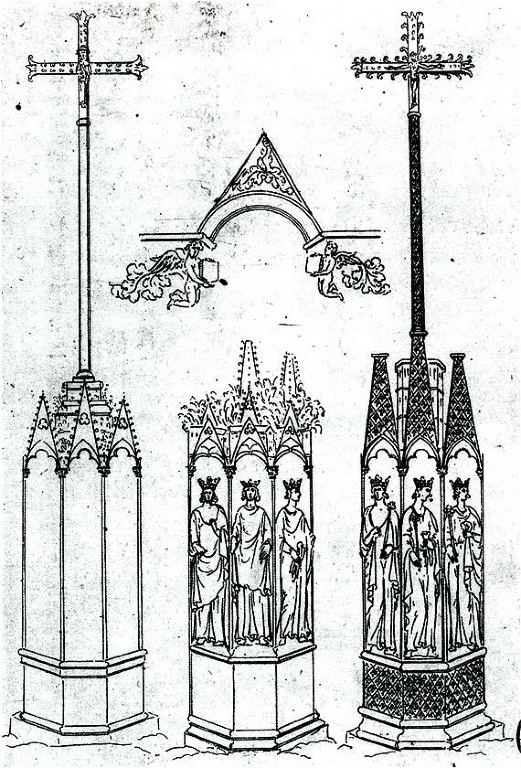
Montjoies de La Chapelle et de Saint-Denis (anonymous etching from the late 17th century).

Montjoies

On May 12, 1271, the procession of Philip the Bold, carrying on his shoulders the bones of his father, King St. Louis, for burial at Saint-Denis, passed through the village. Some ten years later, large stone crosses were built at the sites of Philip the Bold's seven stations. Located on the outskirts of the mound known as Montjoie, which is supposed to have been the site of Saint Denis' martyrdom, these crosses, in turn, became known as montjoies. With a pyramid-shaped base on large, multi-stepped plinths, (Note: A fragment of one of these crosses remains in front of the Basilica of Saint-Denis.) They were hexagonal and featured an openwork colonnade surmounted by mitered arches with, on the roadside, three niches containing large statues of kings and, on the opposite side, three blind niches. These were dismantled in September and October 1793, mainly because they were adorned with numerous fleurs-de-lis. There were also several ordinary crosses along the route, six of which were still standing in 1704 but have now all disappeared; among them, the Croix penchée was so named because of a miracle that is said to have occurred in 1274, when the Croix aux fins bowed to a chalice containing a host, from a ciborium stolen from the church of Saint-Gervais, hidden at its feet by the thiefur. This Crux ad fines marked the boundary between the jurisdiction of Paris and that of Saint-Denis: it was at this point, for example, that the shrine of Notre-Dame was handed over by the bishop of Paris to an officer of the abbey of Saint-Denis during the Lendit fair, or that the Parisian clergy handed over the kings remains to the monks of the abbey at his funeral.

From 1338, Saint-Denys church was the starting point for the Notre-Dame-des-Vertus pilgrimage to the Notre-Dame-des-Vertus church in Aubervilliers. The Évangile cross, located at the crossroads of today's rue de l'Évangile and rue d'Aubervilliers, marks a milestone on the route.

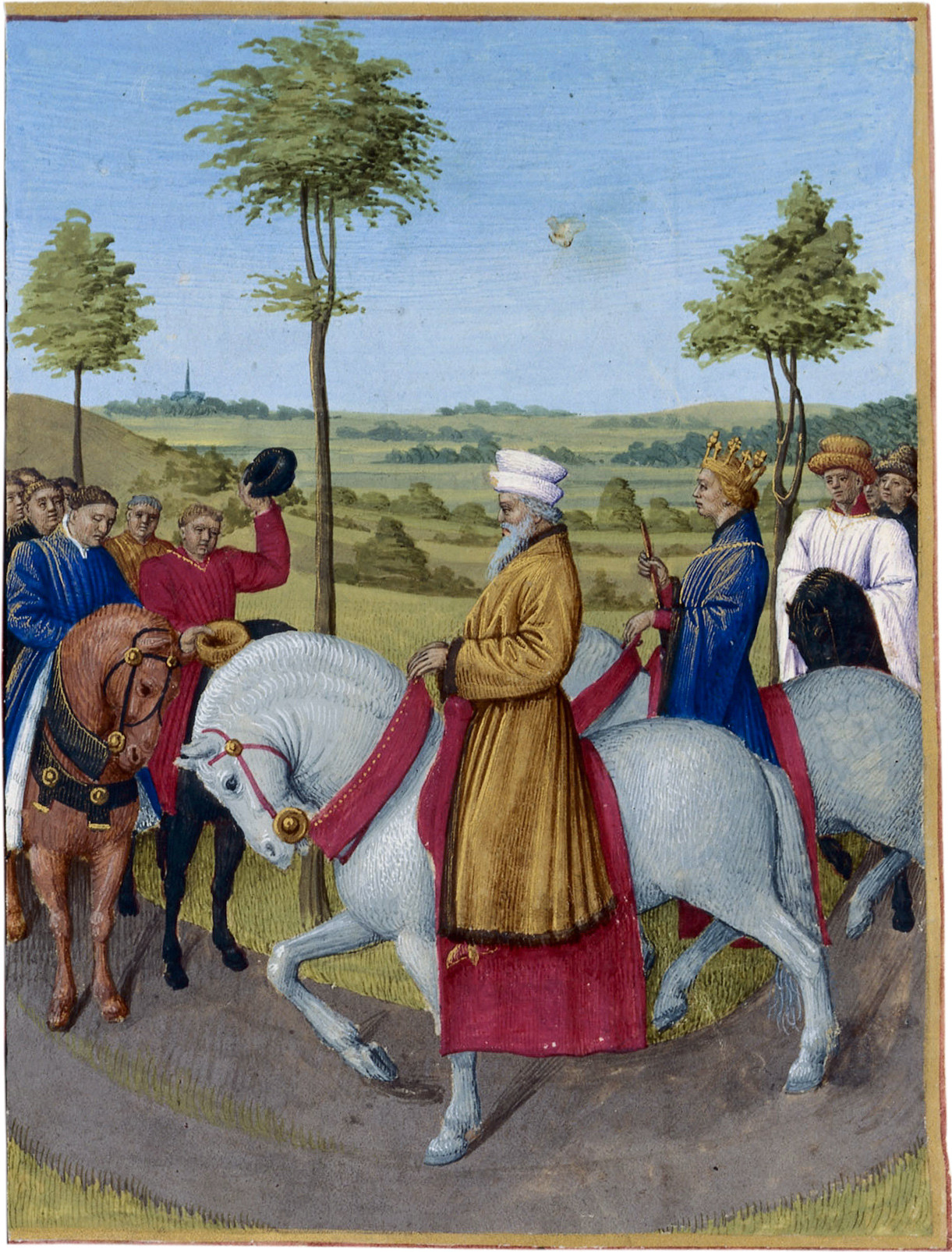
Charles IV's arrival at La Chapelle, Grandes Chroniques de France (f.442v.), illuminated by Jean Fouquet, circa 1455-1460.

Crossroads

During the Great Jacquerie in 1358, the fields and vineyards of the village of La Chapelle-Saint-Denis, as well as the granary of the Lendit fair, were devastated and set on fire by the English and the troops of Charles le Mauvais, King of Navarre, (Note: "[They] ravage villages, such as La Chapelle near Saint-Lazare, the market town of Saint-Laurent near Paris, the lendit barn and Saint-Cloud." - Chronicle of Guillaume de Nangis) under the supervision of Étienne Marcel from the La Chapelled windmill. (Note: The first known windmill in the history of the Paris region, it was certainly located in today's rue Philippe-de-Girard.) These regular depredations led, at the request of the villagers, to an ordinance by Charles V freeing La Chapelle from the obligation to house troops and from the right of capture in exchange for twenty carts of paille. On January 4, 1378, Charles V met his uncle, the German Emperor Charles IVa 2. The village was again devastated on October 3, 1411 and July 8, 1418, by the Armagnacs, in battles against the Burgundians. The church was burnt down during the latter attack.

In 1427, a troupe of 120 Bohemians, supposedly from Lower Egypt and claiming to have converted to Catholicism, settled there, armed with a bull from Pope Martin V entrusting them to ecclesiastical charity, and lived by begging and fortune-telling. Accused of theft and witchcraft, they were excommunicated by Jacques du Chastelier, Bishop of Paris, and ordered to leave the village.

==== Joan of Arc ====
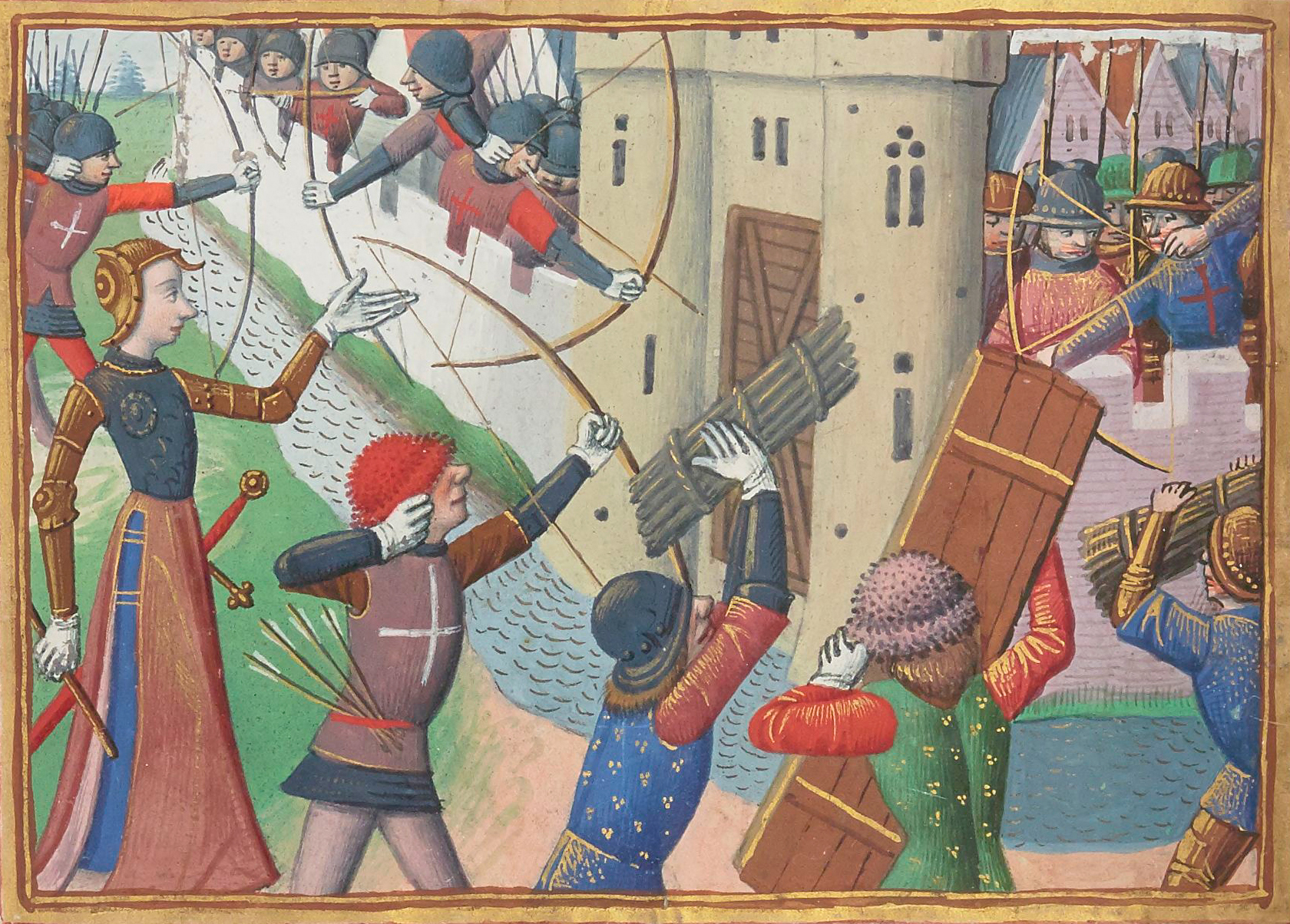
Joan of Arc during the siege of Paris in 1429. Miniature from the manuscript by Martial d'Auvergne, Les Vigiles de Charles VII, circa 1484, BNF.

After the coronation of Charles VII in Reims in 1429, Joan of Arc headed for Paris to deliver the city, then in English hands. After the battle of Montépilloy on August 15, 1429, Charles VII's troops began the siege of Paris on September 3. Joan of Arc was staying in the village of La Chapelle with the Dukes of Alençon and Bourbon, the Counts of Vendôme and Laval, Marshals Gilles de Rais and Lahire, and their troops. After several days of reconnaissance and skirmishing at various Parisian gates, Joan of Arc prayed in Sainte Geneviève chapel before storming the capital. In the early hours of Thursday, September 8, La Pucelle, the Duke of Alençon, Marshals Gilles de Rais and Jean de Brosse de Boussac set off from the village to storm the Porte Saint-Honoré. The attack failed, and Jeanne, wounded in the thigh by a crossbow vireton, was taken back to her home at La Chapelle. Although she would have liked to resume the attack on Paris, the king ordered her to retreat to the abbey of Saint-Denis.

The years that followed brought great insecurity around La Chapelle, and brigandage flourished, taking advantage of the war between the French and English between Saint-Denis and Paris. Once peace had returned, Charles VII passed through the village on his way to making a triumphant entry into Paris in 1437, but it was at the foot of the Leaning Cross in 1461 that the officers carrying the king's body demanded an additional ten sols from each of them to continue their journey. The success of the Lendit fair provided La Chapelle with a comfortable financial income during the fortnight between Saint Barnabas' Day and Saint John's Day, but by the end of the Middle Ages it had declined as the Champeaux market expanded. By the middle of the 15th century, the fair's catchment area had shrunk, and it was only attended by merchants from Île-de-France, Picardy, Champagne, Normandy, Burgundy, the banks of the Loire and the Centre. The opening ceremony, during which the rector of the University of Paris came in procession to acquire the much-prized parchments and other indispensable materials, eventually turned into a cavalcade, resulting in much ransacking. The fair was temporarily transferred inside the walls of Saint-Denis in 1444, depriving the little town of some of its activity, and definitively by Henri II in 1556.

From the Renaissance to the French Revolution

In 1498, the abbey of Saint-Denis leased the administration of the village to a representative in charge of collecting tithes, while the Grand Aumônier de Saint-Denis levied cens and rentes. The latter also had the right of justice, which was exercised in a building to the left of the church. The carcan (pillory) was installed on an elm serving as a justice post on the edge of the cemetery while a gallows and pitchforks were located further north, towards Saint-Denis.

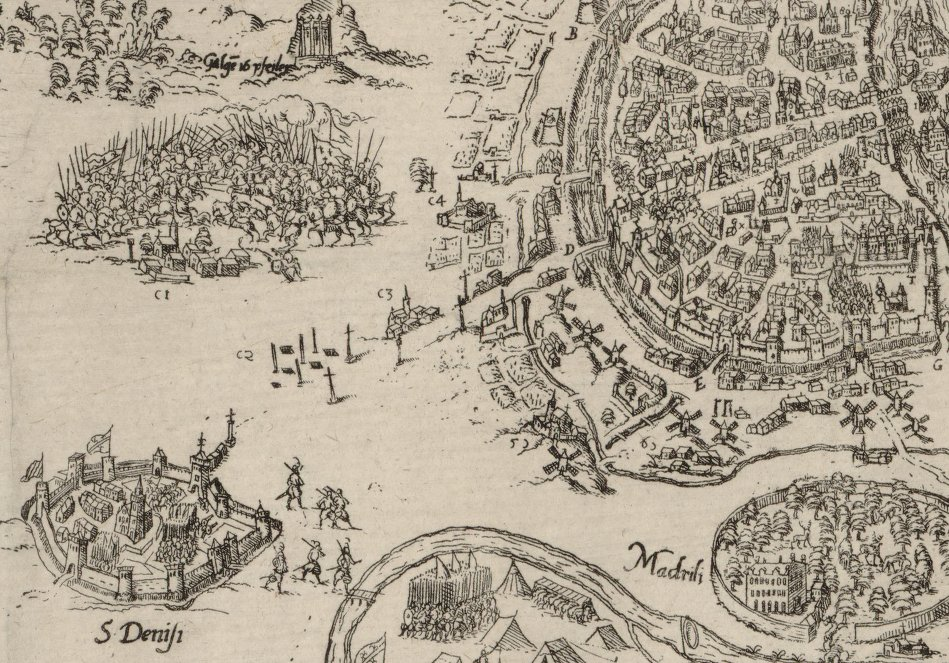
La Chapelle (legend C3) during the Wars of Religion, plan by Mathis Zundten, 1565.

In November 1567, the village was not spared by the Wars of Religion, and was at the center of the Battle of Saint-Denis, (Note: Although it took place in La Chapelle-Saint-Denis) in which Catholics and Huguenots clashed and the Constable de Montmorency was mortally wounded by a bullet in the back. To reinforce the League's defense of Paris, the Council of the Union surrounded the village of La Chapelle with a wall that lasted for over a century. During the siege of Paris in 1590, Henri IV's royal troops occupied the village.

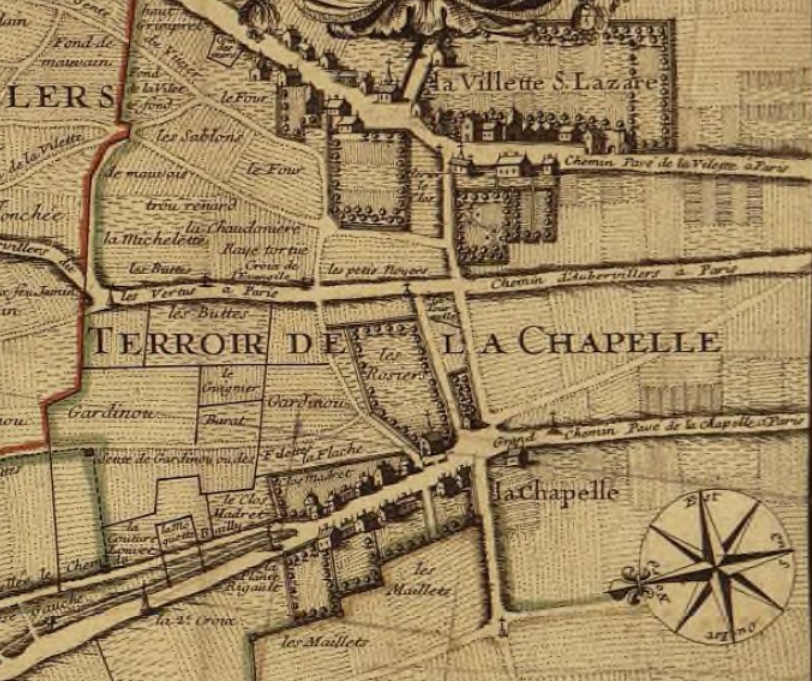
The La Chapelle area in 1707.

La Chapelle, like many of the villages around Paris besieged during the Fronde, was devastated by fighting and looting, and many of its inhabitants died "of disease, necessity and misery", but the survivors rebuilt the sacristy as early as 1664, restored the church itself in 1670 and continued to develop and expand their village.

Until the French Revolution, the village of La Chapelle was attached to the seigneury of Saint-Denis, owned by the abbey since the 15th century. (Note: A 1661 factum recalls the abbey's rights over the parish of La Chapelle: "The land of La Chapelle has always depended on the chaplaincy of Saint Denys. The chaplains are its spiritual and temporal lords. For the temporal, they have high, medium, and low justice and Baillage, all seigneury and property over the entire extent of the chaplaincy. For the spiritual, they are the Patrons, appoint the priest to serve the cure or perpetual vicarage, and present him to the archdeacon of Paris, and he presents him to Monsieur l'archevesque, who confers".) Exclusively rural, it was made up of winegrowers and market gardeners, as well as cabaretiers, (Note: In 1728, there were fifteen wine merchants on Grande-Rue alone.) carriage hirers, blacksmiths, and carters who set up along the road leading from Paris to Saint-Denis. Guinguettes began to develop around the 1660s, as a means of escaping the high taxes levied on wine as it entered Paris and saw an influx of workers and soldiers, as well as Parisian bourgeois looking for a stroll in the "countryside and suburbs". Their numbers grew steadily over the centuries. One of these innkeepers, whose sign was Le Grand Faucheur, was named sole legatee of Louis XIV's historiographer, François Eudes de Mézeray, who had fallen in love with the village. These taverns played host to the discreet meetings of the Fillon (Note: Famous courtesan and owner of a Parisian brothel) and Cardinal Dubois, which helped foil the Cellamare Conspiracy, as well as the raucous Cartouche gang, which included a native of the area, the rascal Marie Miou, known as Charlotte La Chapelle. At the end of the 18th century, the town even had its brigade of maréchaussée to maintain order and patrol the cabarets and guinguettes.

The houses were located near the church and the house of the bailli, the village administrator appointed by the abbey. At the beginning of the 18th century, the seigneury of La Chapelle comprised forty-three locations. In the course of the 17th and 18th centuries, country houses sprang up around the church, notably that of Sébastien Slodtz, sculptor of numerous monuments in Paris and Versailles.

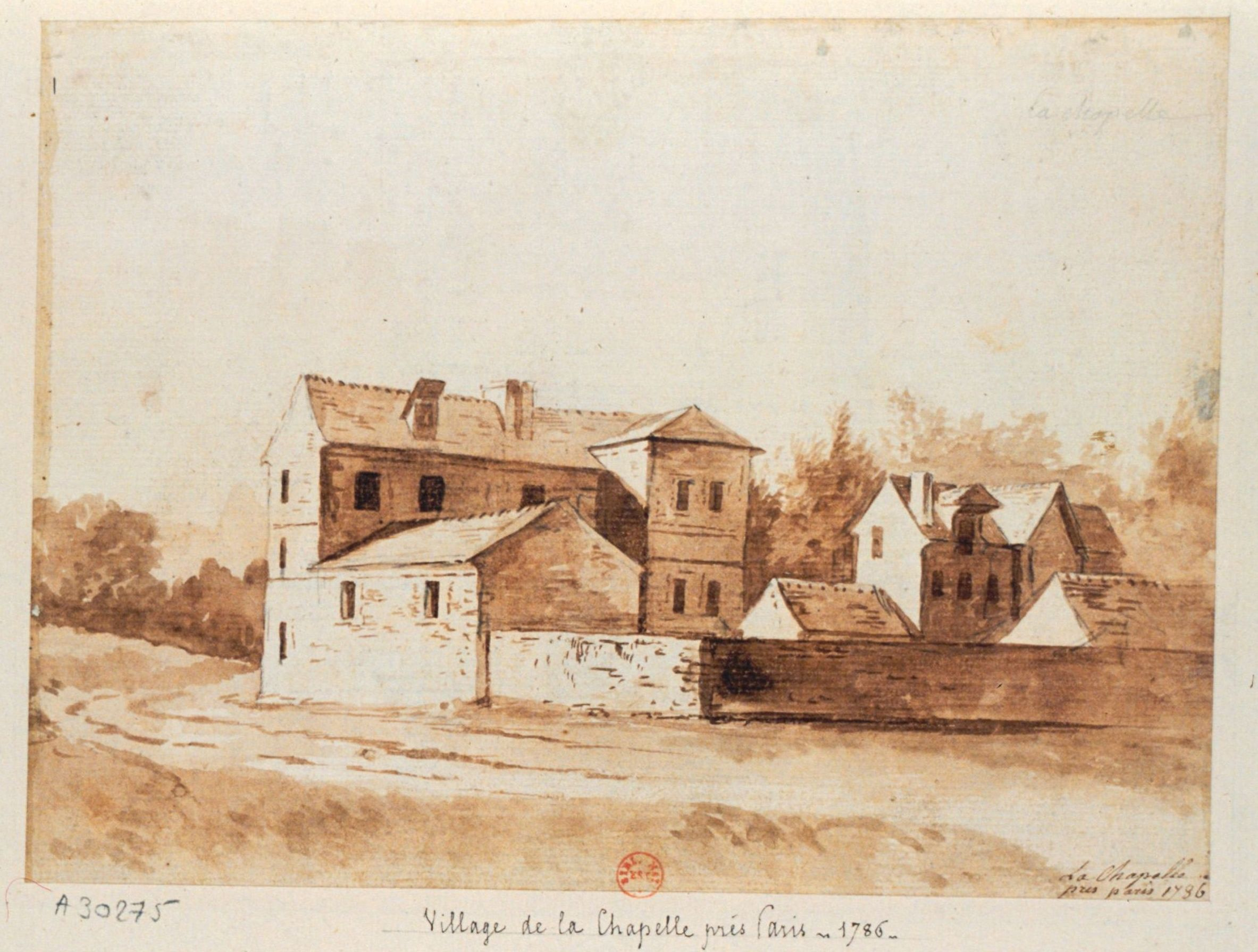
Village of La Chapelle in 1786 showing farms or pleasure houses. Anonymous drawing.

In the 1720s, La Chapelle benefited from the demarcation of the enclosures and boundaries of Paris and its suburbs, a Parisian operation designed to tolerate the construction of only modest houses with a boutique and a small doorway, not a carriage entrance, and with a single upper floor. The gradual urbanization of the faubourgs, beyond the boulevards that had replaced the enclosure built by Charles V in 1671, linked the faubourg Saint-Denis to La Chapelle, at least on the rue principale. The road to Saint-Denis was rebuilt, aligned, and widened to 65 meters, a vast traffic circle was built and two ancient marble columns that Suger had compared to Hercule were preserved. However, in the absence of a sidewalk, the large paved road linking Paris to the south, with its heavy traffic, remained inconvenient and dangerous for pedestrians. In 1757, the old Gothic tympanum of Saint-Denys church was replaced by a classical façade with four pilasters and Doric capitals framing the doorway, topped by a cornice, a bull's eye surrounded by drapery and a triangular pediment dominated by a cross and adorned with a royal coat-of-arms. To enter Paris, villagers had to pass through one of the gates of the Ferme Générale, in particular the offices of Sainte-Anne, Saint-Denis, Ravinet or Saint-Martin. (Note: Current rue du Faubourg-Poissonnière, rue du Faubourg-Saint-Denis, rue Philippe-de-Girard and rue du Château-Landon respectively.) The main one was the majestic Porte Saint-Denis, a triumphal arch erected to the glory of Louis XIV by the architect François Blondel.

Although La Chapelle was the only town bordering Paris to have no religious community, (Note: Henri Sauval nevertheless mentions the arrival in 1698 of the Filles de Sainte-Agathe, who were quickly chased out of the village by the parish priest.) Several congregations owned vineyards and orchards. Around 1760, around the Grande-Rue, (Note: From 1675 to 1867, Grande-Rue was the name given to the part of the main road from Paris to Calais that passed through the village of La Chapelle.) There were no more than a dozen streets. (Note: Rue des Rosiers, rue des Francs-Bourgeois, rue du Four, rue de la Madone, rue de la Croix-de-l'Évangile, place du Marché, rue du Bon-Puits, rue de la Tournelle, rue du Curé and rue Marcadet) To the southwest of the village, on the butte des Couronnes, were five windmills, still in operation at the time of the Revolution. At the foot of this hill was the hamlet of Goutte d'Or, named after the wine produced there. In 1788, La Chapelle had a population of 148, or 600 to 800 inhabitants.

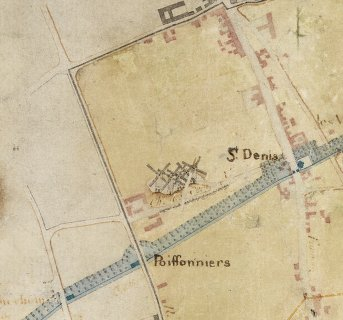
The five Goutte d'Or mills in 1789.

La Goutte-d'Or and the La Chapelle mills

The name Goutte d'Or is found in a document from the Archives Nationales in 1474, referring either to a locality where vines were grown or to the sign of a wine merchant selling a white wine made from grapes harvested at the same location. (Note: "Jean Gillon gives Renaud de Maugès, priest, two acres of vines in a place called la Goutte d'Or. The main crop is vines.") Legend has it that, under the reign of Saint Louis, this wine was declared the "king of wines". In the Middle Ages, four muids of this wine were offered to the king on the anniversary of his coronation.

Around 1720, a road was opened by the Congregation of Saint-Lazare, which owned these lands, (Note: The boundaries of this territory correspond to our current boulevard Barbès to the west, rue Ordener to the north, rue Marx-Dormoy to the east and boulevard de la Chapelle to the south.) to link the Rue des Poissonniers to the Faubourg de Gloire. The Butte des Couronnes, which could be called the Petit Montmartre, is located in the middle. (Note: Rue Polonceau follows its crest) According to Anne Lombard-Jourdan, the Merovingian basilica of Saint Martin, was built on its summit. (Note: This hypothesis is contested by Michel Fleury)

Sloping gently eastwards, it was probably home to several windmills as early as the 16th century, amidst a few vineyards to the southwest and pasture fields. From the 1750s onwards, there were five of them, fairly close together, along a road that became Rue Polonceau in 1842: Moulin des Couronnes, (Note: At nos. 36 to 40 rue Polonceau) Moulin Goudin, (Note: On the site of 23, rue des Gardes) Grand Moulin, (Note: Called Moulin Fauvet at the Restoration, after the owner of a nearby guinguette, a descendant of a Montmartre miller, it stood on the site of no. 14 of the now-defunct Passage Léon, which corresponds to the center of the central alley of Square Léon.) Petit Moulin (Note: At nos. 3 and 5 rue Saint-Luc) and Moulin neuf. Now plaster mills, they were fed by the gypsum quarries created south of the butte or those on the butte Montmartre, which had been expanding considerably since the 17th century.

A property called "La Goutte d'Or" existed in 1764. Around 1787, an artificial nitrière, known as the "nitrière des Cinq-Moulins", was installed on the southern slope of the butte, with large workshops and sheds. That year, it supplied over six million pounds of saltpetre to the French state's powder and saltpetre board. In 1814, a nearby hamlet developed around the old chemin des frères Lazaristes, rectified and widened in 1750, and named chemin du hameau de la Goutte d'Or. (Note: It corresponds to today's rue de La Goutte-d'Or and rue de Jessaint.) Virtually uninhabited at the time of the French Revolution, it began to develop in 1824, when permission was granted to subdivide it outside the built-up area. The nitrière was closed in the early 19th century and the mills disappeared after the Restoration.

Other mills stood at Les Potences, a name already mentioned in the 16th century, to the south of the village, in the middle of the fields. Moulin de la Tour is undoubtedly the mill at which Joan of Arc fought in September 1429. (Note: "Then the King came to Saint-Denis [...]. In addition, proceeding further, His ost drew at La Chapelle And from there to the windmill Where there was a beautiful skirmish". - Martial d'Auvergne, La Chronique de la Pucelle) On November 12, 1567, Captain Guerry, a Catholic opposed to the Huguenots, used this stone mill as a fortified bastion against the violent assaults of the Protestants, who had burned all the surrounding mills but were unable to seize this one. It was also this mill that Mademoiselle de Montpensier evoked in a picturesque episode of the Fronde, in 1652, and which was the starting point of the fighting between the troops of the rebellious Condé and Turenne's royal army, which turned to the advantage of the former. (Note: These events may have taken place in three different mills, all located at Les Potences.)

In the 17th century, these included Moulin Bleu, Moulin Yvon, and Moulin de la Maison. The following century saw the Moulin Neuf, the Moulin du Poulet-Bleu, the Moulin des Potences, and the Moulin des Sureaux. With the Fermiers Généraux wall running through the middle of the locality, the last two mills found themselves inside the walls of Paris.

Constitution of the commune

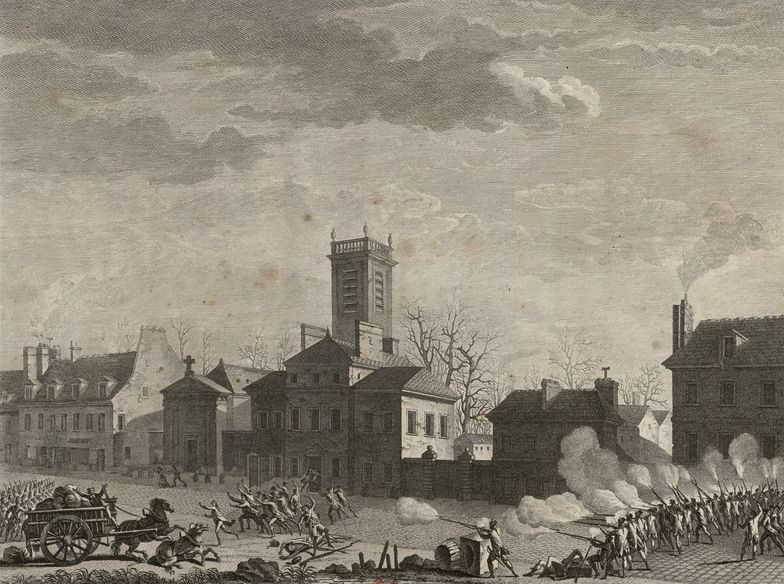
Massacre at La Chapelle, by barrier hunters in January 1791. Print from 1802.

The commune of La Chapelle was created by the November 12, 1789 decree of the National Constituent Assembly, according to which "there shall be a municipality in every town, village, parish or country community". On July 31, 1790, the Assembly passed a decree "uniting to the municipality of La Chapelle that part of the faubourg Saint-Denis, in Paris, known as the faubourg de Gloire". This corresponds to the part of the Faubourg Saint-Denis below the Fermiers Généraux wall. It included the territory of Goutte d'Or, which at the time contained only mills and a nitrière. When the commune was formed, documents on the history of the parish disappeared when they were transferred to the Archives nationales.

As early as 1789, La Chapelle residents' grievances focused on the damage caused to farmland by game and royal hunting: (Note: "This land often trodden by the feet of tyrants, this land once the scene of their pleasures and on which, waging war on birds, they destroyed the foodstuffs necessary for man, this land no longer feels the contagion they spread there, fertile in all its points, everywhere it bristles with ears of corn destined for the republicans who inhabit it." - Address to the Convention, Prairial 28, Year II) for several centuries, the area had been rich in game, and in 1699 was the scene of a major "bird hunt" organized for the corps of ambassadors present in France. Louis XV loved to indulge in his hunting pleasures, and by the mid-18th century, game sheds had been set up to house hares, rabbits and partridges. Even if the communal organization of La Chapelle was non-existent, it nevertheless benefited from more tangible coordination, from 1788 onwards, when a campaign of complaint and protest against the methods of the Fermiers généraux was undertaken, under the leadership of the parish syndic, M. Gautier, assisted by a lawyer ex-employee of the Gabelles, a certain Darigrand, whose memoir served to draft the cahiers de doléance of the Paris suburbs. (Note: Also known as "Paris hors les murs".) In 1790-1791, the land and vineyards owned by various religious congregations, including the parish priest, were sold as national property.

Since the creation of the Fermiers généraux enclosure, the village of La Chapelle had a reputation as an active smuggling center, where salt and tobacco were smuggled in, leading to numerous raids, despite the strong hostility of the population.

On January 24, 1791, the La Chapelle Massacre took place: after some inhabitants were suspected of not respecting the rules of the octroi, a few dozen "chasseurs de barrières", a military corps responsible for guarding the Parisian barriers, under the command of M. de Keyssac, fired on a battalion of the Paris Guard who had come to help the mayor of La Chapelle, who sounded the tocsin; the incident left two people dead. (Note: A version of the town council minutes reported in Marat's newspaper L'Ami du peuple mentions several deaths.) Politicians got involved: Bailly defended his troops and the tax authorities, while La Fayette supported the National Guard, which had quickly come to the aid of the municipal officials; even Parisian newspapers such as Père Duchesne, by Jacques-René Hébert, Le Courrier, by Antoine-Joseph Gorsas, and Les Révolutions de Paris, by Louis-Marie Prudhomme, commented on the scuffle.

The victims were buried the following day in the cemetery on the site of Place de Torcy, behind the church of Saint-Denys. The epitaphs of citizens Jullien, sergeant-major, and Auvry, National Guard volunteer, were engraved on a Bastille stone donated for the occasion by Pierre-François Palloy. This cemetery, the second in the village, had been opened around 1704 to replace the first, founded around 1200, located opposite the church of Saint-Denys, some forty meters long and overhanging the Grande-Rue. (Note: The location of this cemetery corresponds to the current sidewalk in front of Saint-Denys church and the adjoining Sainte-Jeanne-d'Arc basilica.) In 1763, the Croix-Cottin was erected here, and in 1887 transferred to the forecourt of Saint-Pierre de Montmartre.

The territory of La Chapelle was again devastated by the establishment of the Camp sous Paris, which had been formed after August 10, 1792, from Clichy to Montmartre, (Note: On June 8, 1792, at the instigation of Louis XVI and the suggestion of war minister Joseph Servan, the National Assembly decreed the formation of a 20,000-strong camp to protect Paris from invasion. The fright caused by the advance of enemy troops to Verdun led to an influx of Parisians to the site from September onwards.) but which quickly became a hotbed of indiscipline and turbulence, described as "a hodgepodge of idlers and scoundrels who riot after riot", difficult to contain. (Note: The Sans-Culottes section declared on September 25, 1792: "there are 8,000 men there who do nothing, guarded by 200 men who prevent no disorder".)

=== In the 19th century ===
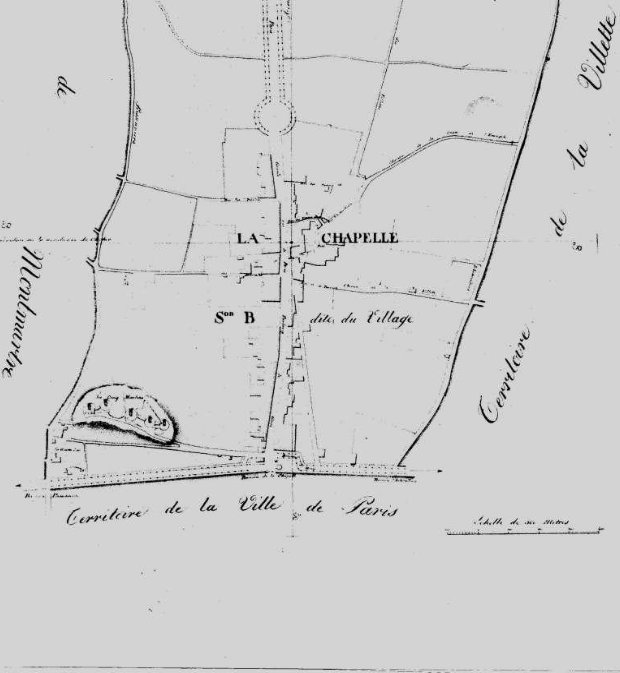
Southern part of La Chapelle-Saint-Denis in 1814.

During the Battle of Paris in 1814, the village was at the heart of troop movements, leading to serious depredations by the troops. Gebhard Leberecht von Blücher's troops camped here before entering Paris. The church was requisitioned for the storage of fodder and horses for the cavalry and train. More than eight hundred soldiers and as many mounts were housed in the village, compounding the considerable damage to crops on the batail fields.

Between 1841 and 1844, the capital was hemmed in by Thiers' enceinte. The commune of La Chapelle was cut in two. The part inside the walls was rapidly urbanized, attracting a rural population thanks to low housing costs. Urbanization was the result of subdivisions built by landowners, such as the Cottin or Trutat de Saint-Ange families, or speculators who acquired plots of land mainly for agricultural purposes until the 1830s. A large number of inns and hostelries continued to occupy the main street, while some guinguettes (dance halls) hosted dances and other cabarets played billiards. Agriculture, which in 1805 represented 292 hectares of the commune's 354 hectares, was in rapid decline. The land, fields, and gardens that were rejected extra muros were also separated from their owners or operators.

Industrial Revolution

The Industrial Revolution, linked in particular to the development of the railroads, profoundly altered La Chapelle and the former hamlet of La Goutte d'Or. The line from Paris-Nord to Lille was opened in 1846 by the Compagnie des chemins de fer du Nord. The commune was served by the Pont-Marcadet station. The widening of the railway line following the development of the railroads separated the commune of La Chapelle into two parts, creating a real divide with the village of Clignancourt, part of the commune of Montmartre. To the north of the village center, the La Chapelle depot was built. The Paris-Strasbourg line opened in 1849, and the infrastructure of the Paris-Strasbourg railway company (after 1854, Compagnie des chemins de fer de l'Est) separated La Chapelle from La Villette. A junction between the two networks was granted to both companies by decree on December 10, 1851. This junction doubled the length of the Petite Ceinture line. The first section of this railway line went into service from Batignolles to La Chapelle on December 11, 1852, and from La Chapelle to Bercy on March 25, 1854. Several factories opened in the commune: Christophe François Calla's foundry, Gellé frères, and Violet perfumeries. Like the commune of Montmartre, La Chapelle saw an ever-increasing influx of people who had come to work in Paris but could not afford to live there. Between 1836 and 1856, its population increased sevenfold.

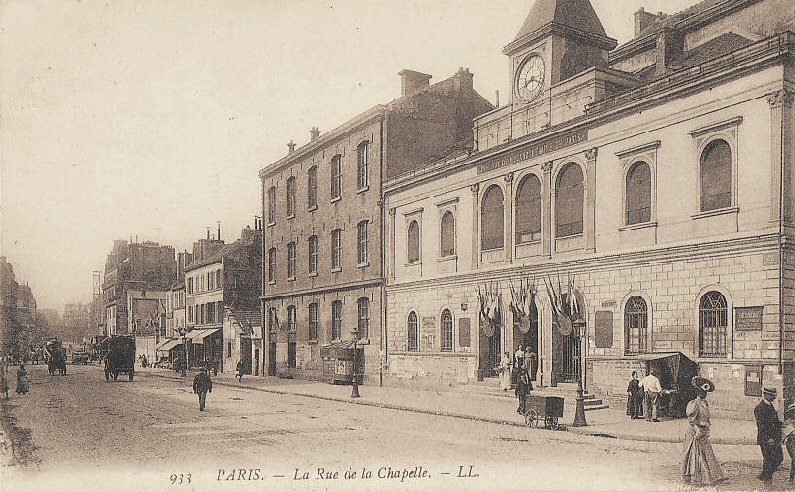
La Chapelle town hall, inaugurated in 1845 (early ^{20th-century} postcard).

In 1843, the municipality of La Chapelle decided to build a new town hall. Inaugurated on February 16, 1845, by the Prefect of the Seine, Rambuteau, it was located on the site of today's Collège Marx-Dormoy and included a justice of the peace, schoolroom, and a police station. In 1850, a new cemetery, the current Parisian Cemetery of La Chapelle, was opened outside the precinct to complement the Marcadet Cemetery. Opened in 1804 outside the town, on rue Marcadet, (Note: This small cemetery, originally measuring 6.34 acres, is shown on the Napoleonic cadastral plan of 1814, west of rue Marcadet, in a rectangle dotted with small crosses.) to replace the former burial ground on place de Torcy in the heart of the village, this cemetery was itself overtaken by population growth and the cholera epidemic of 1849, and was finally closed and disused in 1878. As a result of the rapid urbanization of the Goutte d'Or area, it was decided to build a second church to serve the new quartier. Construction of the Saint-Bernard de la Chapelle church and a fifth communal school began in 1858. This new place of worship, intended to be a modest building, benefited from annexation to Paris, which provided it with a porch and, in a curious twist, the mayor and councilors of the former commune, as well as the parish priest and architect, were depicted on the capitals of the nave and choir pillars, in medieval style. The first Protestant church was built in the second half of the 19th century, in a simple hall to which was added a Protestant school. (Note: Originally on rue des Poissonniers, it was moved to the new neo-Romanesque and ogival Saint-Paul church in 1897.)

In the first two-thirds of the 19th century, the town's population grew considerably, from 800 in the early years of the century to 40,000 by the time it was annexed to Paris, and was enlivened by a huge livestock market held on the site of today's Rue de la Louisiane, Rue de la Guadeloupe, Rue de la Martinique, Rue de l'Olive and Rue du Canada. In 1854, for example, 124,000 pigs and 110,000 calves were sold. The cow market, which had already made the village famous in the early 13th century, had survived the centuries. The Grande-Rue was home to a straw and fodder market, and every June 11, a large sheep fair was held in the town. The livestock market disappeared when La Chapelle was annexed to Paris, competing with that of La Villette and giving way to rue de la Louisiane, rue de la Guadeloupe, rue de la Martinique, rue du Marché and impasse Bizioux. Years later, between 1883 and 1885, Auguste-Joseph Magne built the La Chapelle market on this site, which was listed as a historic monument in 1981. (Note: Inscrit MH (1981))

Alongside the development of the railways, new businesses emerged: wine and liqueurs, steam engines, printing, chemicals, salt and sucre. But La Chapelle remained an important public transport route: worthy heirs to the seventeenth-century coche from Paris to Pontoise or the regular carriages from Paris to Beauvais in the eighteenth century, new carriage lines with picturesque names linked the capital to Saint-Denis: les Coucous, les Favorites, les Célérifères, Les Dames réunies, les Dyonisiennes or les Hirondelles, which gave way, towards the end of the 1850s, to omnibus lines more prosaically named K or J.

=== Division of the commune of La Chapelle ===
On the advice of Prefect Haussmann, Napoleon III decided to annex to Paris the parts of land located in other communes "up to the foot of the fortified enclosure". The municipal council of La Chapelle, fearing that octroi duties would lead to higher prices, opposed the project in vain. Finally recognizing that, despite the prejudices likely to affect the local industry, annexation was in keeping with "the splendor of the capital and ideas of grandeur", he then tried to promote the principle that the extra muros territories could form a new commune under the name of La Chapelle, but the power of the neighboring communes of Saint-Denis and Aubervilliers defeated this project. He also tried to have the "beautiful new town hall", built fifteen years earlier, adopted as the seat of the new municipal district, but this lost out to that of Montmartre, located on Place des Abbesses, (Note: This town hall, built in 1836, was demolished when the current 18th arrondissement town hall was built. The square Jehan-Rictus was created on its site.) which became the seat of the new 18th arrondissement of Paris. Finally, he obtained certain privileges from the government concerning octroi and warehouse duties. The law of June 16, 1859 concerning the extension of Paris from the Fermiers généraux wall to the Thiers enclosure abolished the commune of La Chapelle and divided its territory between:

- Paris, for the most part, located within the bastioned enclosure;
- Saint-Denis
- Aubervilliers, for the part east of the chemin des Fillettes;
- Saint-Ouen, for a small part between the Chemin des Poissonniers and the Nord railway line (after the railway line was widened, this part was incorporated into Saint-Denis in the mid-20th century).

The four administrative districts of the 18th arrondissement of Paris (within its 1929 boundaries).

The part annexed to Paris was attached to the 18th arrondissement of Paris and divided between two of Paris's eighty administrative districts: the 71st, known as the Goutte-d'Or district, and the 72nd, known as the Chapelle district. Following the decommissioning of the Thiers enceinte in 1919, the territories attached to Saint-Denis and Aubervilliers located in the non ædificandi zone of the fortifications ("the Zone") were annexed to Paris by the decrees of July 27, 1930. The Paris ring road was subsequently built on this site.

The rural village, which had become a pleasure town at the end of the 18th century, had been transformed into an industrial town in the years leading up to the annexation. The pleasures and joys of the countryside had disappeared, and with them the bourgeois residences and gardens; only the cabarets and guinguettes had survived the centuries. The galloping sprawl had created a continuous urban fabric right up to the old gates of Paris, and La Chapelle became no more than a district of the capital. The church of Saint-Bernard de la Chapelle, consecrated in 1861, became the seat of the parish, relegating to the status of a mere chapel the church around which the village had been built over more than fifteen hundred years. The large market disappeared around 1870. The Gare du Nord, on the other side of the boulevard, was rebuilt in 1863, and the railroad line was extended, while to the north, inside the fortifications, the Petite Ceinture line and the Gare de La Chapelle-Saint-Denis were created. It was here that the coal that powered the forges, factories and mechanical workshops of this fully industrialized district arrived, and long after the annexation of Paris, it remained one of the city's frontiers:

"The populous suburbs of Montmartre, La Chapelle and La Villette come here to die, in an appalling display of misery. It's human garbage, the swarming of a starving population. Collapsed hovels line the ends of alleyways; dirty linen hangs from windows; ragged children roll around in the mire. A dreadful threshold to Paris, where all the sludge piles up, and on which a stranger would stop trembling." - Émile Zola, Aux champs (read on Wikisource), "La banlieue", p. 197.

== Daily life at La Chapelle ==
Throughout the Middle Ages, La Chapelle was a rural village built around the main road leading from Paris to Saint-Denis. Winegrowers, stockbreeders and market gardeners sold their wares at the annual fairs that punctuated the life of the Seigneurie, under the supervision of the Abbey of Saint-Denis.

Wine was one of the town's main trades, and by the 1720s, there were already more than fifteen drinking establishments along Grande-Rue. The Bailli did what he could to maintain law and order, but the cabaretiers and their clientele had little in common with the moral demands of the village. Nonetheless, the village was bustling with Parisians, both working-class and middle-class, who invaded the cabarets. (Note: "It's no longer just the workers who connoiſſent parties & Sundays. La Courtille, les Porcherons, la Nouvelle-France fillſſent ces jours-là de buveurs.People go there to get boiſſons cheaper than in the city.Several déſordres result from this; but the people get merry, or rather giddy ſur ſon ſort." - Louis-Sébastien Mercier, Tableau de Paris, vol. IV, 1782) But as industrialization and the construction of fortifications passed, the area around the Fermiers généraux enclosure became a populous, hard-working district, where living conditions were often miserable.

There were two butchers on the eve of the Revolution, a profession of sufficient influence that one of them became the commune's first mayor in 1790.

In the early eighteenth century, a small school for girls and boys was housed in the presbytery. By the middle of the following century, the commune of La Chapelle included two elementary school, five private schools and two boarding schools for young girls.

Although the inhabitants did not have running water under the Ancien Régime, they did have wells dug in their homes and benefited from the services of a water carrier. Water from the Seine was only brought to the village in 1845, thanks to the new conductor pipe installations. It wasn't until 1818 that the village's alleyways were lit by oil-powered streetlamps.

If the hygiene and sanitation of the streets were doubtful, a privilege of the inhabitants of La Chapelle, which they had obtained from time immemorial but lost in 1777, allowed them to collect the sludge and filth accumulated in the capital's roads to enrich their land with fertilizer. They stored it in flaches, filthy ditches on either side of the roads. It wasn't until 1853 that a sewer system was established.

== Policy and administration ==
Until the French Revolution, La Chapelle was part of the Île-de-France government, under the general jurisdiction of Paris. This comprised twenty-two elections, including that of Paris, divided into ten sub-delegations, including that of Saint-Denis, which included the parish of La Chapelle.

From the outset, the commune of La Chapelle was part of the Seine department, originally called the "Paris department". It was first incorporated into the district of Saint-Denis, renamed the district of Franciade, and was classified in the canton of Clichy. In 1800, the districts were replaced by arrondissements, and the commune of La Chapelle, following the Consuls' decree of 25 fructidor an IX, became part of the arrondissement of Saint-Denis and was included in the canton of Saint-Denis.

The administration of the village of La Chapelle was entrusted from the early thirteenth century to a mayor under the supervision of the seigneury belonging to the abbey of Saint-Denis. In the 15th century, this function was leased to a resident who collected the cens and rents due to the Aumône and also acted as an auxiliary of justice. For the exercise of justice, this bailli was assisted, with the approval and appointment of the chaplain of the abbey of Saint-Denis, by a bailliage lieutenant and a fiscal procurator, as well as several offices, substitut, clerk, notary, bailiff, seer, etc. The seigneurial administration buildings included the gaols, the wine press and the tithe barnesse.

List of successive bailiffs from 1676 to 1790
Start	Identity	Quality	Comments
1676	Louis Le Grand	Parliamentary lawyer	
1677	Bénigne Lefébure	Parliamentary lawyer	
?	Avistan Perier	Prosecutor at the Châtelet	Died in 1702
1702	Louis Legent	Parliamentary lawyer	Resigned
1710	Denis Le Maistre	Prosecutor at the Châtelet	Resigned
1719	Louis de Séronville	Parliamentary lawyer	
1734	Jacques-Louis de Séronville	Parliamentary lawyer	Son of predecessor
1773	Jacques-Antoine Sallé	Parliamentary lawyer	
1778	Claude-Théodore Mérelle de Joigny	Parliamentary lawyer	Last hearing on December 21, 1790

Under the law of December 14, 1789, the commune of La Chapelle was administered by a municipality consisting of the mayor, five town councillors and eleven notables elected by ballot. The town hall was set up in several locations. From 1790 onwards, the first municipal assembly met at the present site of no. 14 rue de la Chapelle, in a room attached to the presbytery, where it remained even after the presbytery was sold in 1793 as national property. From 1834 to 1845, the second town hall was located at no. 11 rue du Bon-Puits (now rue de Torcy), in a building built on part of the cow market. (Note: The first floor of the building is used as stables for the cow market, part of the second floor is used for fodder, a second floor is occupied by the parish priest and his vicar, a third contains a municipal school and the fourth floor is dedicated to the town hall.) From 1845 to 1860, the third town hall was located at the corner of today's rue Marx-Dormoy (nos. 55-57) and rue Doudeauville, on the site of today's collège Marx-Dormoy. After La Chapelle became part of Paris, this building housed the Justice of the Peace of the 18th arrondissement, then in 1905 the Paris Mechanotherapy Institute, before being demolished in 1906.

List of successive mayors
Period		Identity	Quality
1790	1791	Louis Porte-Fin	Butcher's merchant
1794		Pierre-Charles Desmaretz	
1803	1807	N. Trouillet	
1807	1814	Jean-Louis Boucry	
1815	1830	Baron de Drouard de la Croisette	
1830	1837	N. Cottin	
1837	1845	Antoine Pauwels	
1845	1848	N. Fournier	
1848	1848	N. Bouttevillain	
1845	1848	N. Toutain (Note: "Mayor-president of the Administrative Commission", April 1848.)	Distiller
1848	1849	N. Lavalley (Note: Provisional municipal commission appointed on July 11, 1848 and dissolved on February 3, 1849.)	National Guard Commander
1849	1853	Noël Fleury	
1854	1856	N. de Jarnac	
1857	1859	Antoine Joseph Hébert	
Missing data must be completed.

== Demographic development ==
Population trends at La Chapelle
1793	1800	1806	1821	1831
-	800	1 537	1 492	2 440

1836	1841	1846	1851	1856
4 177	8 664	14 398	18 700	33 355

(source: Cassini)La Chapelle's population remained stable throughout the eighteenth century: 165 in 1709, 748 by mid-century, and 148, or around 700, on the eve of the French Revolution. From 1800 until the commune's annexation to Paris, its population grew rapidly, rising from 800 to over 40,000, despite a sharp reduction in its territory due to the construction of railroads and related facilities at the beginning of the second half of the century.

== Population growth at La Chapelle ==
=== Notable places and monuments ===
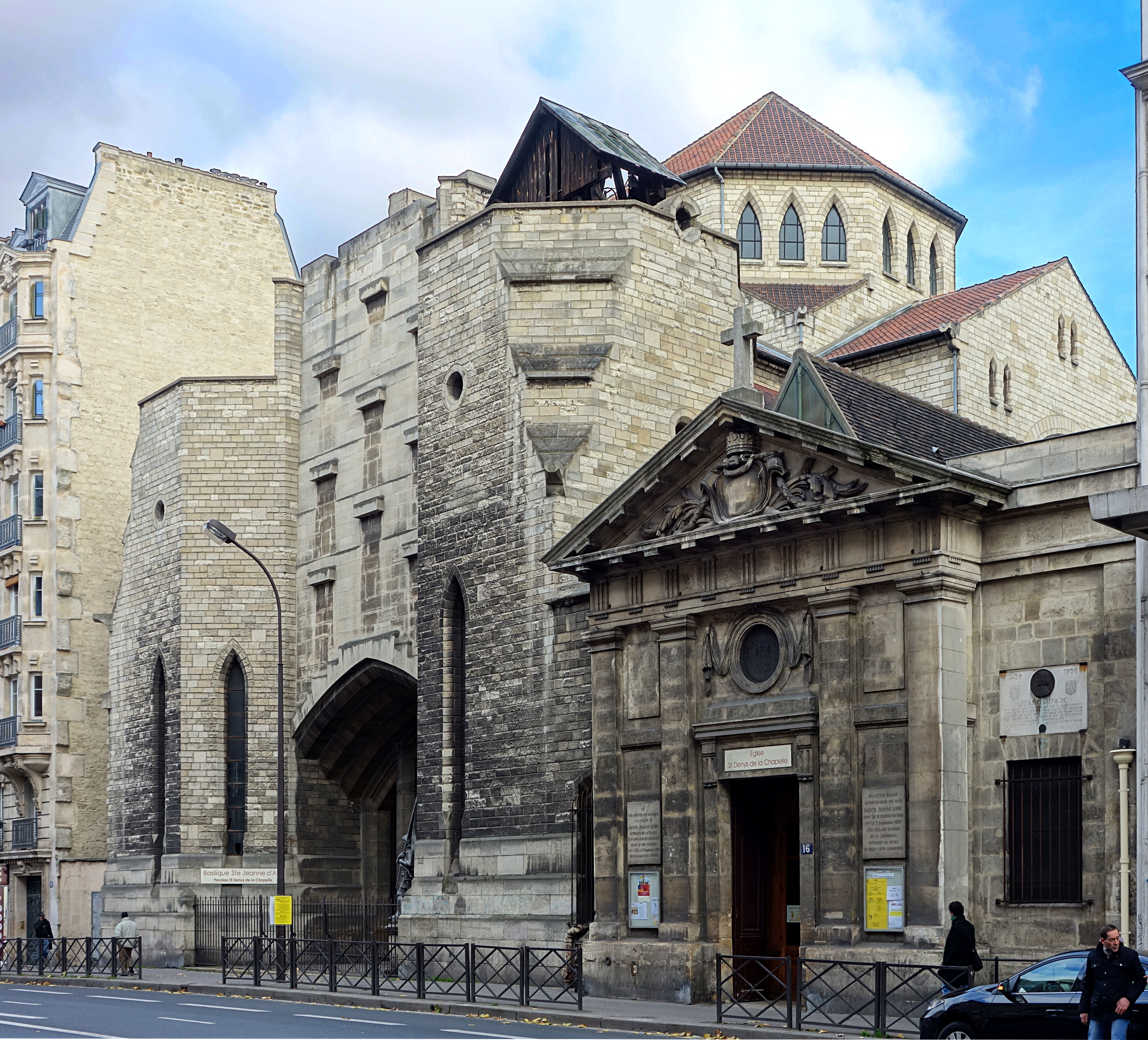
Entrance to Saint-Denys church at no. 16 rue de la Chapelle.

The commune's territory includes several notable sites and monuments, including the Saint-Denys de la Chapelle church, the Saint-Bernard de la Chapelle church (listed as a historic monument on November 26, 2012), the La Chapelle depot, the former Marcadet cemetery, the Parisian de la Chapelle cemetery and the Évangile cross.

Housing has changed considerably since the village was attached to Paris. Many faubouriennes houses have been replaced by taller buildings. In their opinion on the request to demolish 83bis, rue Philippe-de-Girard, the members of the Commission du Vieux Paris expressed "their concern at the systematic purchase of low-lying plots in the outlying districts with a view to densification operations", pointing out that, as a result, "part of the memory of the old villages of Paris is being erased". However, some buildings have been preserved. No. 5 rue Myrha, for example, is a building from the Louis-Philippe period (1830–1848) that the Commission du Vieux Paris has identified as "among the oldest" in the Goutte d'Or district.

=== The Chapel and the arts ===
Émile Zola set the action of his novel L'Assommoir in the Goutte d'Or district, describing La Chapelle as a "suburb of Paris", whose "stinking environment" he wanted to "paint". Although, at the time, it was in fact a separate commune, whose life was more rural than faubourienne, it nonetheless retained the allure of a village, but with "dark corners, black with damp and filth".

Famous residents

Like many Parisian suburbs and neighboring villages, the village of La Chapelle was a vacation spot for a number of Parisian notables, some of whom owned a country house here: the family of Jean de Dormans in the 14th century, Robert Danès, alderman of Paris in the 16th century, and the ancestors of Jean-Baptiste Pigalle from the 16th to 18th centuries. (Note: The relationship between the sculptor and the prominent Pigalle de La Chapelle family has not been formally established, although several details suggest it.)

- Louise de Marillac (1591–1660), founder with Saint Vincent de Paul of the Daughters of Charity. She lived at the corner of today's rue Marx-Dormoy (no. 2) and place de la Chapelle from 1636 to 1641, in an isolated house attached to the faubourg Saint-Denis, where the Filles de la Charité met.
- François Eudes de Mézeray (1610–1683), historian and historiographer. He died in his country home in 1683.
- Claude-Emmanuel Luillier, known as Chapelle (1626–1686), man of letters. Born in the village, the natural son of a maître des requêtes named François Lhuillier, he retained the name of his native village after his legitimization in 1642.
- Guillaume Gibert (1749–1820), financier. On April 12, 1783, he was appointed notary at the Grand Châtelet in charge of the La Chapelle notary's office.
- Philibert-Louis Debucourt (1755–1832), painter and engraver. He owned a country house inherited from his father, who was a tax prosecutor there under the Ancien Régime.
- Louis Jean Plaideux (1768–1827), brigadier general during the French Revolution, who died in Paris, lived his last years in La Chapelle.
- Gustave-Hippolyte Roger (1815–1879), tenor, born in La Chapelle.
- Auguste Roedel (1859–1900), illustrator, poster artist, caricaturist, watercolorist and lithographer, born in La Chapelle.

=== Roads in the commune of La Chapelle ===
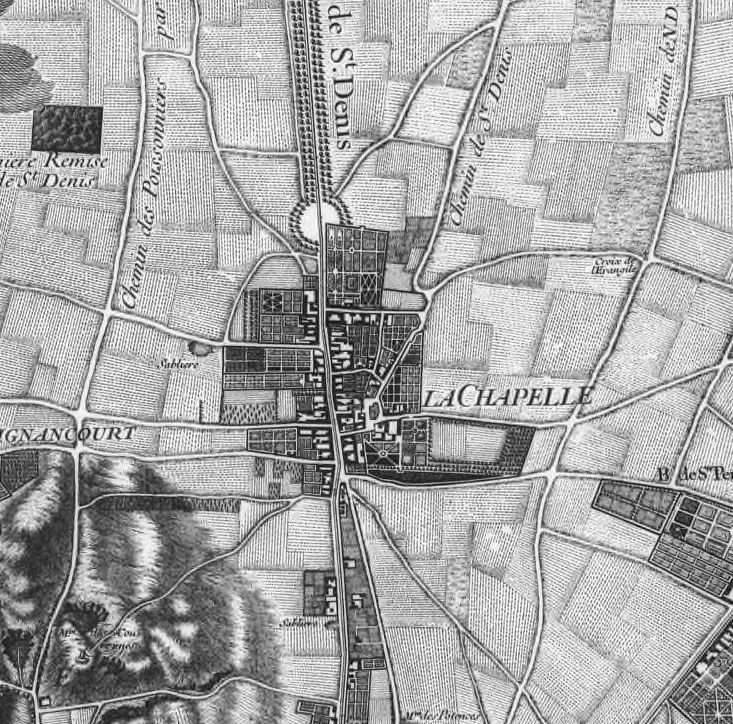
The village of La Chapelle on Roussel's Plan (1730).

The table below lists the public roads in the commune of La Chapelle, which were incorporated into the Paris road network by decree on May 23, 1863, following a decision by the Paris City Council on February 6 of the same year.

However, some of the roads in the commune of La Chapelle, which were annexed in 1863, had been declared to be in the public interest shortly before annexation, and were therefore not built until after June 1859.

List of roads in the former commune of La Chapelle incorporated into the Paris road network in 1863 and 1866
Name in 1863	Current name	Comments
Rue d'Alger	Rue Affre	Renamed August 24, 1864
Chemin d'Aubervilliers	Rue d'Aubervilliers, section between rue Riquet and the glacis de l'enceinte de Thiers	Border between the communes of La Chapelle and La Villette. Joined with rue des Vertus to form rue d'Aubervilliers.
Rue d'Aubervilliers	Rue de l'Évangile, section between place de Torcy and place Hébert	Joined with chemin de la Croix-de-l'Évangile to form rue de l'Évangile on April 2, 1868
Impasse Bizioux	Rue du Canada	Renamed in 1877. Extended to rue de la Guadeloupe in 1881.
Rue du Bon-Puits	Rue de Torcy	The village street is extended by a path shown in Roussel's plan (1730). The street originally continued as far as today's rue d'Aubervilliers, but its eastern section was removed with the construction of the Chemins de Fer du Nord railway line. Renamed on February 27, 1867
Rue Boucry	Rue Boucry Rue Cugnot	Not built at the time of annexation, as it was declared to be in the public interest in May 1859. The part of the street between Place Hébert and Rue Cugnot was incorporated into Rue Cugnot in 1978.
Rue Buzelin	Rue Buzelin	Authorized to open in 1858.
Rue Caplat	Rue Caplat	
Rue Cavé	Rue Cavé	
Rue de Chabrol	Rue Philippe-de-Girard Impasse de la Chapelle	A former road extended into the Montmartre commune by the chemin de la Charbonnière (now rue du Simplon) to the chemin de la Procession (rue du Mont-Cenis). It appears on Roussel's plan (1730). Became a cul-de-sac when the northern railway line was widened, and was originally crossed by a bridge. Renamed in 1873.
Boulevard de la Chapelle	Boulevard de la Chapelle, section between Rue Marx-Dormoy and Boulevard Barbès	Absorbs Boulevard des Vertus and other thoroughfares in the 10th arrondissement on December 30, 1864
Rue de la Charbonnière	Rue de la Charbonnière	From the name of a locality.
Rue de Chartres	Rue de Chartres	
Rue des Cinq-Moulins	Rue Stephenson, section between rue de Jessaint and rue Doudeauville	Renamed February 27, 1867. Extended to Rue Ordener in 1863-1892.
Rue des Couronnes	Rue Polonceau	Renamed August 24, 1864. Formerly part of chemin et rue des Cinq-Moulins, then chemin des Couronnes.
Rue de Constantine	Rue Myrha, section between rue Stephenson and rue des Poissonniers	Joined rue Myrha, a former thoroughfare of the Montmartre commune, on April 2, 1868.
Rue de la Croix-de-l'Évangile	Rue de l'Évangile, section between place Hébert and rue d'Aubervilliers	Joined with rue d'Aubervilliers to form rue de l'Évangile on April 2, 1868
Ruelle du Curé	Impasse du Curé	It became a dead end with the construction of the Northern Railway tracks.
Rue du Département	Rue du Département, section between rue d'Aubervilliers and rue Marx-Dormoy	Linked to a street in the former commune of La Villette.
Rue Doudeauville	Rue Doudeauville, section between rue Marx-Dormoy and rue des Poissonniers	United in 1873 with rue Charles-Henri, part of the former commune of Montmartre.
Rue Ernestine	Rue Ernestine, section between rue Doudeauville and rue Marcadet	Extended to rue Ordener on July 20, 1868
Rue de l'Est	Rue Cugnot between rue Riquet and rue Boucry (north of rue Marc-Séguin)	Renamed on August 24, 1864. The section between rue Riquet and rue de Torcy was eliminated in 1931 when the track was widened for the compagnie des chemins de fer de l'Est.
Rue des Filettes	Rue des Filettes	Formerly, it was called Chemin des Fillettes, or chemin de Saint-Denis, according to Roussel's plan (1730). It led to the commune of Aubervilliers, where it remains today: it separates this commune from that of Saint-Denis. Thiers' fortifications bisected the road, and the part to the north of the fortifications was annexed by the communes of Saint-Denis and Aubervilliers in 1859. The section to the north of today's rue Tristan-Tzara disappeared when the freight tracks of the Compagnie des chemins de fer du Nord were built.
Rue Fleury	Rue Fleury	
Rue des Francs-Bourgeois	Rue Marc-Séguin, section between rue de la Chapelle and rue de l'Évangile	Old street shown on Roussel's plan (1730). Reunited with rue Robert to form rue Marc-Séguin in 1894.
Rue des Gardes	Rue des Gardes, section between rue Polonceau and rue Myrha	United at rue Saint-Charles on April 2, 1868
Rue de la Goutte-d'Or	Rue de la Goutte-d'Or	Old road leading to the Goutte-d'Or hamlet, as shown on Roussel's plan (1730).
Grande-Rue	Rue de la Chapelle rue Marx-Dormoy	Estrée, road from Paris to Saint-Denis, central axis of the village. Roman road. Path shown on Roussel's plan (1730). Renamed rue de la Chapelle on February 26, 1867; the southern part was renamed rue Marx-Dormoy in 1945.
Rue du Gué	Impasse du Gué	Former road shown on Roussel's plan (1730). Became a dead end with the construction of the Chemins de Fer du Nord tracks.
Place Hébert	Place Hébert	Not completed at the time of annexation, as it was declared to be in the public interest in May 1859. Named after a former mayor of La Chapelle.
Rue Jean-Robert	Rue Jean-Robert	
Rue de Jessaint	Rue de Jessaint	Former road leading to the Goutte-d'Or hamlet, shown on Roussel's plan (1730). Named in 1824.
Place de Jessaint	Place de la Chapelle	In front of the barrier of the same name. Renamed December 30, 1864
Passage Lecante	Rue Erckmann-Chatrian Rue Richomme, section between rue des Gardes and rue Erckmann-Chatrian	Renamed rue Richomme on August 24, 1864; the southern part was renamed rue Erckmann-Chatrian in 1904
Rue Léon	Rue Léon, section between rue Cavé and rue d'Oran	Extended to rue Marcadet in 1906 and rue Ordener in 1925.
Rue Marcadet	Rue Marcadet, section between place Paul-Éluard and rue des Poissonniers	Part of the former Chemin des Bœufs (road from La Chapelle to Clichy) shown on Roussel's plan (1730)82. Its name derives from a place called la Mercade (from the Latin marcadus) near the church of Saint-Denys de la Chapelle, where the Lendit fair was held.
Place du Marché	Place de Torcy	Formerly Place du Bon-Puits; Place du Cimetière after 1704; Place du Marché after the transfer of the cemetery in the early 19th century. The square appears on Roussel's plan (1730). Renamed February 27, 1867.
Rue du Marché	Rue de l'Olive	Rue L'Olive after 1875, then rue de l'Olive since 2011.
Rue Martin	Rue Caillié	Formerly Place du Bon-Puits; Place du Cimetière after 1704; Place du Marché after the transfer of the cemetery in the early 19th century. The square appears on Roussel's plan (1730). Renamed February 27, 1867.
Rue Mazagran	Rue de Laghouat	Renamed August 24, 1864
Rue Militaire	Boulevard Ney, section between rue de la Chapelle and rue des Poissonniers	Section of Rue Militaire. Renamed March 2, 1864
Rue Neuve-du-Bon-Puits	Rue Pajol, section between rue Riquet and place Hébert	Not built at the time of annexation, as it was declared a public utility in May 1859. Joined with rue de Strasbourg and rue Neuve-de-Strasbourg on October 2, 1865 to form rue Pajol
Rue Neuve-de-Strasbourg	Rue Pajol, section between rue du Département and rue Riquet	Joined with rue Neuve-du-Bon-Puits and rue Neuve-de-Strasbourg on October 2, 1865 to form rue Pajol
Rue d'Oran	Rue d'Oran	
Rue des Poiriers	Impasse de la Chapelle	A former road extended into the Montmartre commune by the chemin de la Charbonnière (now rue du Simplon) to the chemin de la Procession (rue du Mont-Cenis). It appears on Roussel's plan (1730). Became a cul-de-sac when the northern railway line was widened, and was originally crossed by a bridge. Renamed in 1873.
Rue de Strasbourg	Rue Pajol, section between rue du Département and rue Riquet	Joined with rue Neuve-du-Bon-Puits and rue Neuve-de-Strasbourg on October 2, 1865 to form rue Pajol
Chemin des Poissonniers	Rue des Poissonniers, section between rue Marcadet and boulevard Ney	Chemin des Poissonniers, historic route between Paris and the coasts of northern France. Boundary between the communes of La Chapelle and Montmartre.
Rue des Poissonniers	Rue des Poissonniers, section between boulevard de Rochechouart and rue Marcadet	Part of the Chemin des Poissonniers. Boundary between the communes of La Chapelle and Montmartre. The southern part, which connected in Paris with rue du Faubourg-Poissonnière, was absorbed by boulevard Barbès in 1863.
Rue du Pré-Maudit	Rue du Pré	The eastern section disappeared when the Northern Railway built its freight tracks. Renamed in 1920.
Rue Robert	Rue Marc-Séguin, section between rue Pajol and rue de l'Évangile	The extension to rue Cugnot was declared a public utility on July 2, 1864. Reunited with rue des Francs-Bourgeois to form rue Marc-Séguin in 1894.
Rue des Rosiers	Rue des Roses	Old street shown on Roussel's plan (1730). Formerly rue des Orfèvres on the Beausire plan (1724–1729). Renamed February 26, 1867
Rue Saint-Charles	Rue des Gardes, section between rue de la Goutte-d'Or and rue Polonceau	Joined Rue des Gardes on April 2, 1868
Rue de Strasbourg	Rue Pajol, section between rue du Département and rue Riquet	Joined with rue Neuve-du-Bon-Puits and rue Neuve-de-Strasbourg on October 2, 1865 to form rue Pajol
Rue de la Tournelle	Rue Riquet, section between rue d'Aubervilliers and rue Marx-Dormoy	Old street and road shown on Roussel's plan (1730). Joined on October 2, 1865 with two other roads in the former commune of La Villette to form rue Riquet.
Rue de Valence	Rue Saint-Bruno, section between rue Stephenson and rue Affre	Renamed September 20, 1869
Boulevard des Vertus	Boulevard de la Chapelle, section between rue d'Aubervilliers and rue de la Chapelle	Absorbed, along with other thoroughfares in the 10th arrondissement, by Boulevard de la Chapelle on December 30, 1864
Rue des Vertus	Rue d'Aubervilliers, section between boulevard de la Chapelle and rue Riquet	Boundary between the communes of La Chapelle and La Villette. Joined with chemin d'Aubervilliers to form rue d'Aubervilliers.
Rue de la Vierge	Rue de la Madone	Old street shown on Roussel's plan (1730). Ruelle Notre-Dame in 1704, then rue de la Vierge in 1834. Renamed on February 26, 1867

== See also ==
- Goutte d'Or
- 18th arrondissement of Paris
- Saint-Denys de la Chapelle
- Seine (department)
- Chapelle

== Bibliography ==
- François, Jacques (2000). Chronique de la Chapelle Saint-Denis: Des origines à nos jours. Paris.
- Hillairet, Jacques (1954). Évocation du vieux Paris: Les villages (" Le village de La Chapelle-Saint-Denis "). Éditions de Minuit.
- Hillairet, Jacques (1997). Dictionnaire historique des rues de Paris, vol. I et II. Paris: Éditions de Minuit. ISBN 2-7073-1054-9.
- Hillairet, Jacques (1993). Connaissance du vieux Paris: Les villages ("Le village de La Chapelle-Saint-Denis"). Paris: Rivages. ISBN 2-86930-648-2.
- Lambeau, Lucien (1923). La Chapelle Saint-Deniscoll. « Histoire des communes annexées à Paris en 1859 ». Paris: Ernest Leroux.
- Lesbros, Dominique (2014). Promenades dans les villages de Paris: 16 itinéraires de charme dans les anciens faubourgs de la capitale, La Chapelle-Saint-Denis. Paris: Parigramme. ISBN 978-2-84096-547-3.
- Lombard, Anne (1989). "Montjoie et Saint-Denis!": le centre de la Gaule aux origines de Paris et de Saint-Denis. Paris: Presses du CNRS. ISBN 2-87682-029-3.
- Lombard, Anne (1987). "" Les foires de l'abbaye de Saint-Denis; revue des données et révision des opinions admises ", Bibliothèque de l'École des chartes". Bibliothèque de l'École des Chartes. 145 (2). Paris: Librairie Droz: 273–338. doi:10.3406/bec.1987.450473. ISSN 0373-6237.
