= Austin Post (photographer) =

American photographer

- Post in 2003
- Born: Austin S. Post; 16 March 1922
- Died: 12 November 2012 (aged 90)
- Known for: Aerial photography of the mountains glaciers of North America

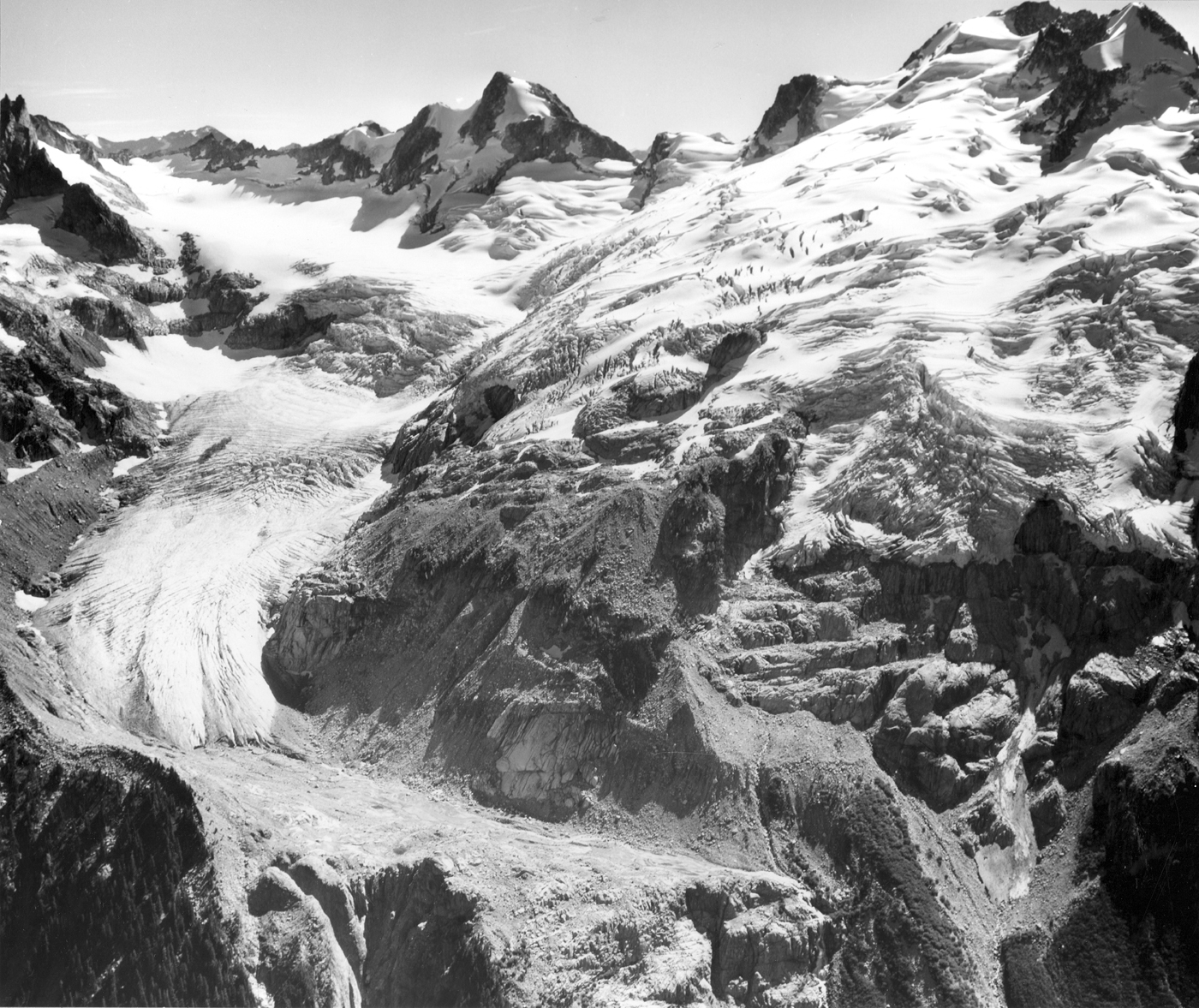
Chickamin Glacier, Dome Peak, 1965

Austin S. Post (16 March 1922 – 12 November 2012) was a photographer, glaciologist, and mountaineer known for his aerial photography of the mountains and glaciers of North America, particularly the North Cascades of Washington and Glacier Bay, Alaska.

Post worked for many years as a research scientist for the United States Geological Survey and was awarded an honorary degree from the University of Alaska-Fairbanks in 2004, despite not having graduated from high school. Many of his photographs were used in the Cascade Alpine Guide series by Fred Beckey. Post named Bradford Washburn as a photographic influence. He lived on Vashon Island, Washington.

== Selected publications ==
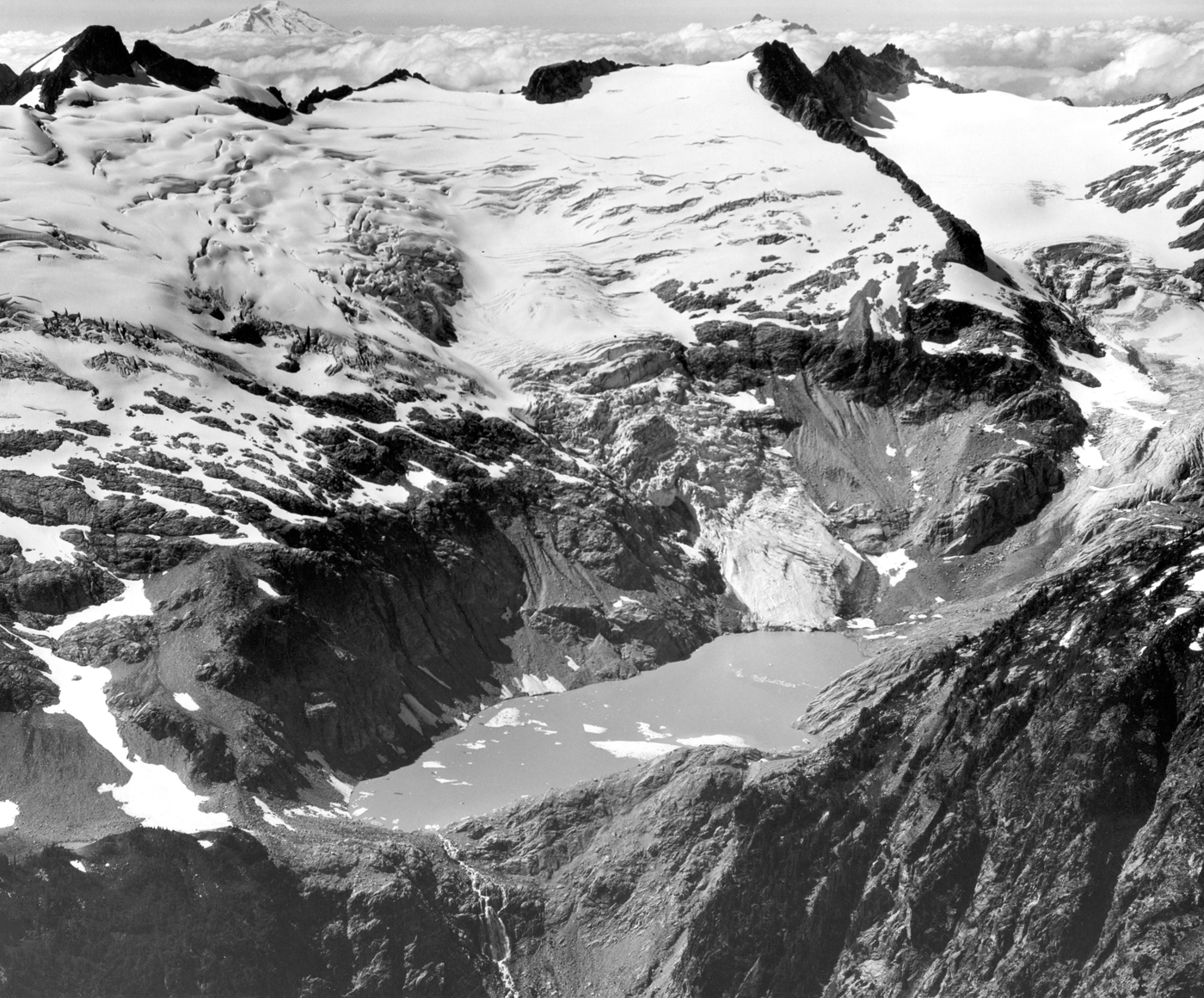
Klawatti Glacier, North Cascades National Park, 1969

- Post, Austin; Don Richardson; Wendell V. Tangborn; F. L. Rosselot (1971). Geological Survey Professional Paper 705—A: Inventory of Glaciers in the North Cascades, Washington. United States Geological Survey. doi:10.3133/pp705A.
- Brugman, Melinda M.; Austin Post (1981). USGS Circular 850-D: Effects of Volcanism on the Glaciers of Mount St. Helens. United States Geological Survey. Archived from the original on 22 February 2007.
- Post, Austin; LaChapelle, Edward R. (2000) [1971]. Glacier Ice (2nd ed.). University of Washington Press. ISBN 0-295-97910-0.

== Selected ascents ==
- First ascent of the Southeast Ridge of the White Princess, Eastern Alaska Range, 1950, Austin Post, Gottfried Ehrenburg, Don MacAskill, Lawrence E. Nielsen
