= Dolores LaChapelle =

American mountaineer

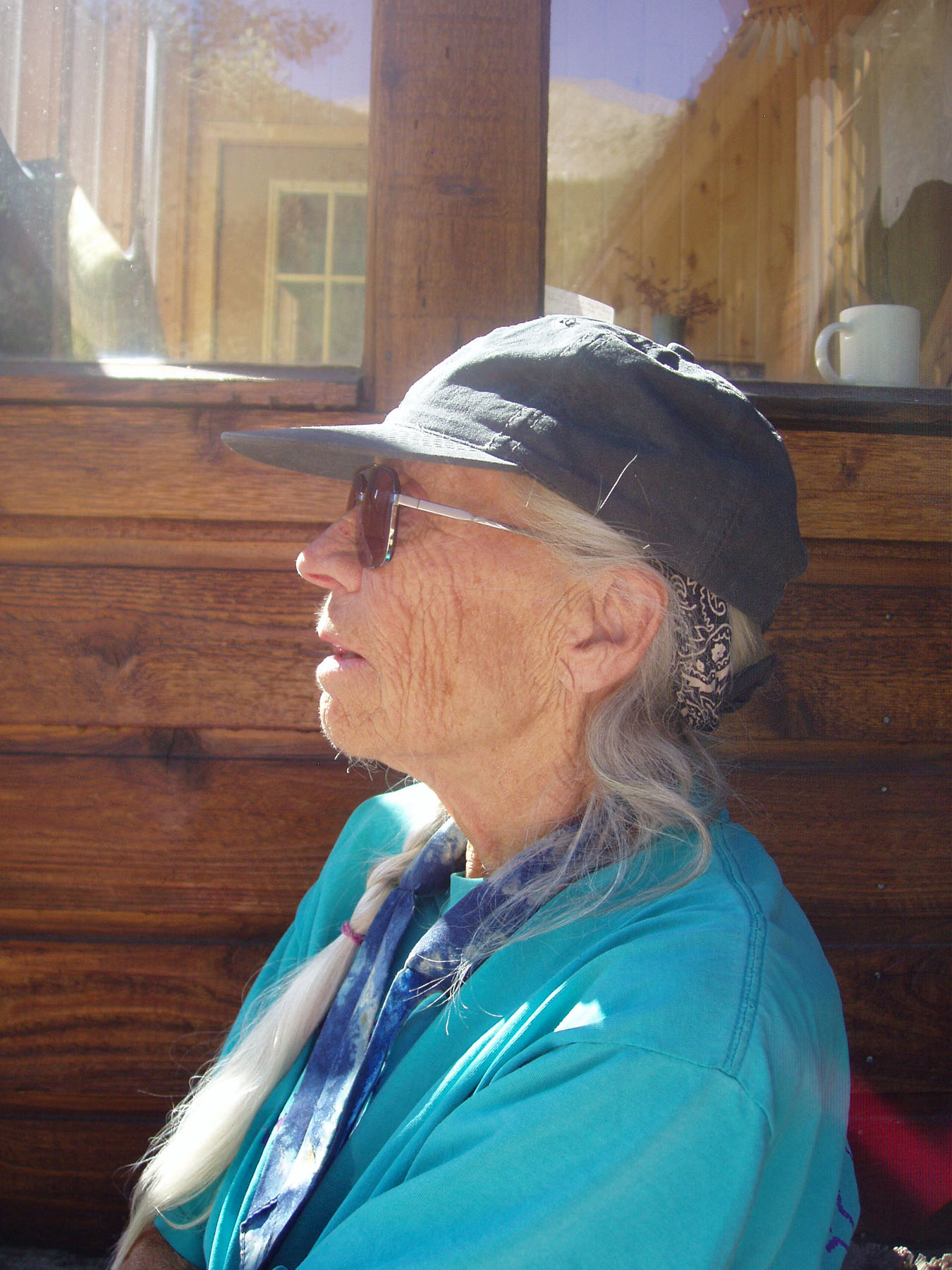
LaChapelle in 2005

Dolores LaChapelle (née Greenwell) (July 4, 1926 – January 21, 2007) was an American mountaineer, skier, tai chi teacher, independent scholar, and leader in the Deep ecology movement.

== Early life and background ==
Born in Denver, Colorado, on July 4, 1926, she attended Catholic girls schools and graduated from University of Denver in 1947 and then spent three years teaching skiing in Aspen, Colorado.

== Career ==
In 1950, she made the first ski ascent of Mount Columbia, the second highest peak in the Canadian Rockies, and also of Snow Dome, the hydrographic apex of the continent. After marrying Edward LaChapelle, she spent a year with him in Davos, Switzerland from 1950 to 1951, and then they moved to Alta, Utah. In 1952, their son Randy was born in Denver, Colorado (Randy changed his name to David LaChapelle in his adult years). As a family they would rotate three times a year to their homes and workstations in Alta, Utah, where they spent winters and Randy/David was homeschooled; the Olympic Mountains Blue Glacier Washington, where they spent summers; and Kirkland, Washington. Dolores and Ed moved to Silverton, Colorado, in 1973 initially because it was here that Ed carried out avalanche research. Later they would separate though they maintained their friendship and professional literary companionship. Ed set up life in Alaska. Dolores, however, enjoyed the San Juan Mountains in southwestern Colorado, the rest of her life. She operated "Way of the Mountain center" from her home publishing, writing, teaching, skiing, sharing ceremony and music.

Dolores was, first and foremost, a philosopher and researcher. The extent of her research spanned a variety topics, which she tracked in a vast library of books and articles; She noted and cross-referenced every text she would use in her collection in over a dozen hand typed three-ring binder compendiums. This body of research includes hundreds of biographical files chronicling a her life, including: accounts of mountain climbs, as she climbed all 14K (above 14,000 feet) mountains of Colorado Rockies by age 20; letter correspondence with authors and poets such as Gary Snyder and Art Goodtimes; and her years married to pioneering avalanche and snow scientist Ed LaChapelle. This corpus was stored in Silverton awaiting the opportunity for better archiving and accessibility until July 2011 when the collection's steward, Ananda Foley, (equivalent of Dolores' daughter-in-law) arranged a proper home for this collection with Aspen Center for Environmental Studies. Ananda has organized the biographical materials and stories of the LaChapelle lives. A posting of this project can be found at the LaChapelle Legacy website. She looks forward to hearing from persons interested in participating in this biographical project (info current as of July 2012).

In 2004 Dolores LaChapelle received the "Ski History Maker" award from the University of Utah as one of the ten women who figured most prominently in the history of skiing. Of all the women in her field to receive this award, she was the "only back-country skier in the bunch", according to her close friend Peter.

LaChapelle died on January 21, 2007, after an enjoyable evening of Copper River salmon supper with David Grimes who said they enjoying singing "Goodnight Irene, Goodnight" before she turned in for bed. Just before closing her door, she said to him "what a great song that is, isn't it?"

== Books ==
- Deep Powder Snow: Forty Years of Ecstatic Skiing, Avalanches, and Earth Wisdom, Kivakí Press, June 1993, ISBN 1-882308-21-2.
- Tai Chi: Return to Mountain, Hazard Press, 2002.
- D.H. Lawrence: Future Primitive, University of North Texas Press, April 1996, ISBN 1-57441-007-5.
- Earth Festivals: Seasonal Celebrations for Everyone Young and Old, Finn Hill Arts, 1976, ISBN 0-917270-00-2.
- Earth Wisdom (New Natural Philosophy Series) Guild of Tutors Press, 1978, ISBN 0-89615-003-8.
- First Steps in Faith, Herder and Herder, 1969, ASIN: B0006BYRW0.
- Sacred Land, Sacred Sex: Rapture of the Deep: Concerning Deep Ecology and Celebrating Life, Kivakí Press, 1992, ISBN 1-882308-11-5.

== Quotations ==
- "In traditional cultures, when a woman is through bearing her children she automatically becomes an elder who is consulted by all the tribe because she "knows." - Sacred Sex, Sacred Land, and Relationship
- "Contrary to generally accepted opinions, it was neither Christianity nor the development of agriculture alone which created the split between humans and the rest of nature in our European tradition." - Sacred Land, Sacred Sex: Rapture of the Deep, p. 24

== Articles ==
- Ritual is Essential Art and Ceremony in Sustainable Culture, Spring, 1984, Context Institute.
- Sacred Sex, Sacred Land, and Relationship, By Dolores LaChapelle. Talking Leaves, Winter 2001. Volume 10, Number 3.
