= Edward LaChapelle =

American glaciologist (1926–2007)

- Ed LaChapelle in 2006
- Born: May 31, 1926; Tacoma, Washington
- Died: February 1, 2007 (aged 80); Monarch Ski Area, Colorado
- Education: University of Puget Sound, 1949
- Known for: Avalanche research and forecasting
- Scientific career
- Fields: Geology, Glaciology, Snow Science
- Workplaces: University of Washington, 1967–1982

Edward Randle "Ed" LaChapelle (May 31, 1926 – February 1, 2007) was an American avalanche researcher, glaciologist, mountaineer, skier, author, and professor. He was a pioneer in the field of avalanche research and forecasting in North America.

== Background ==
LaChapelle was born and raised in Tacoma, Washington. Following high school at Stadium High School, he served in the Navy from 1944 to 1946, and then attended the University of Puget Sound, graduating in 1949 with degrees in physics and math. He then studied at the Swiss Federal Institute for Snow and Avalanche Research in Davos, Switzerland from 1950 to 1951, and returned to the US to work as a snow ranger for the Forest Service in Alta, Utah, starting in 1952. Montgomery Atwater, who had established the first avalanche research center in the Western Hemisphere at Alta over the preceding 7 years, said of his new hire: "To describe Ed LaChapelle is to write the specifications for an avalanche researcher: graduate physicist, glaciologist with a year's study at the Avalanche Institute, skilled craftsman in the shop, expert ski mountaineer. He even looked like a scientist, tall and slender with a slight stoop and that remote look in his eye which means peering into one's own mind." LaChapelle worked at Alta for the next two decades, eventually becoming head of the avalanche center.

He married Mary Dolores Greenwell and they had a son Randy (later changed his name to David) whom they homeschooled and offered a life filled with skiing, art, high mountain adventures and a crucial blend of Ed's scientific, mechanically oriented and inventive mind and Dolores' care for the earth and what the field of her work would later call Deep Ecology. They would travel with the seasons following Ed's professional work and so they shared their time between three homes: Alta in the winter, Blue Glacier in the summer and Kirkland the rest of the year.

From 1967 to 1982, LaChapelle was professor of atmospheric sciences and geophysics at the University of Washington, and then professor emeritus following his retirement until his death. From 1973 to 1977, he was involved in avalanche studies at the Institute for Arctic and Alpine Research (INSTAAR) of the University of Colorado at Boulder. In 1968, he was involved in the development of the avalanche transceiver, which has since become a standard piece of safety equipment for backcountry skiing. He also travelled extensively to do research on snowfall and glaciers in Greenland, Alaska, and notably the Blue Glacier on Mount Olympus in Washington. He retired to live with his partner, Meg Hunt, in a one-room log cabin in McCarthy, Alaska, completely off the grid with solar energy systems and a garden rich diet. The homesite, Porphyry Place, is (at the time of this update 11/2010) of interest to Wrangel St Elias field school, Ed and Meg's longtime neighbors who are raising the money to purchase it.

Ed and Meg were in Colorado to attend the memorial service of his former wife, Dolores LaChapelle, in January 2007. They were doing what Ed liked best, skiing powder snow at Monarch Ski Area near Salida, Colorado, when he suffered a heart attack at the high altitude.

Ed's professional library of research became the property of his son David who in turn placed the collection in the keeping of the San Juan Historical Archive building in Silverton, Colorado, through a grant from the Center for Snow and Avalanche Studies. The collection remains on loan thanks to The LaChapelle Library.

== Books by Edward LaChapelle ==
- LaChapelle, Edward R. (1985). The ABC Of Avalanche Safety. The Mountaineers. ISBN 0-89886-103-9.
- Ferguson, Sue A.; LaChapelle, Edward R. (2003). The ABCs Of Avalanche Safety. Mountaineers Books. ISBN 0-89886-885-8.
- LaChapelle, Edward R. (2001). Field Guide to Snow Crystals. International Glaciological Society. ISBN 0-295-98151-2.
- LaChapelle, Edward R. (2001). Secrets of the Snow : Visual Clues to Avalanche and Ski Conditions. University of Washington Press. ISBN 0-295-98151-2.
- Post, Austin; LaChapelle, Edward R. (2000). Glacier Ice. University of Washington Press. ISBN 0-295-97910-0.
