= National Register of Historic Places listings in Southeast Fairbanks Census Area, Alaska =

Location of the Southeast Fairbanks Census Area in Alaska

This is a list of the National Register of Historic Places listings in Southeast Fairbanks Census Area, Alaska.

This is intended to be a complete list of the properties and districts on the National Register of Historic Places in Southeast Fairbanks Census Area, Alaska, United States. The locations of National Register properties and districts for which the latitude and longitude coordinates are included below, may be seen in a Google map.

There are 12 properties and districts listed on the National Register in the census area, including 1 National Historic Landmark.

This National Park Service list is complete through NPS recent listings posted December 12, 2025.

== Current listings ==
	Name on the Register	Image	Date listed	Location	City or town	Description
1	Alaska-Canada Military Highway (Segment)	Alaska-Canada Military Highway (Segment)	July 31, 2013 (#13000543)	West of Alaska Highway, about 37 miles (60 km) southeast of Delta Junction; 63°43′53″N 144°42′02″W	Delta Junction	Now part of the access road to Craig Lake
2	Big Delta Historic District	Big Delta Historic District	March 20, 1991 (#91000252)	Mile 274.5 of Richardson Highway at the junction of the Delta and Tanana Rivers; 64°09′17″N 145°50′24″W	Big Delta	
3	Chicken Historic District	Chicken Historic District	September 30, 2001 (#01001053)	Mile 66.5 of Taylor Highway; 64°04′29″N 141°55′56″W	Chicken	
4	Chisana Historic Mining Landscape	Chisana Historic Mining Landscape	May 14, 1998 (#98000436)	Vicinity of Chisana and Gold Hill; 62°06′10″N 141°53′58″W	Northway	Also partly comprised in Copper River Census Area
5	Eagle Historic District	Eagle Historic District	October 27, 1970 (#70000919)	Roughly the town of Eagle and the area of Fort Egbert; 64°47′28″N 141°12′56″W	Eagle	
6	F.E. Company Dredge No. 4	F.E. Company Dredge No. 4	May 18, 2006 (#06000435)	Along Airport Road, south of mile 66.4 of Taylor Highway; 64°04′11″N 141°56′19″W	Chicken	
7	The Kink	The Kink	November 20, 1975 (#75002161)	Along the North Fork Fortymile River, about 21.5 miles (34.6 km) north of Chicken; 64°23′08″N 142°01′38″W	Chicken	
8	Rapids Roadhouse	Rapids Roadhouse	February 2, 2001 (#01000021)	Mile 227.4 of Richardson Highway, about 35 miles (56 km) south of Delta Junction; 63°31′46″N 145°51′31″W	Delta Junction	
9	Rika's Landing Roadhouse	Rika's Landing Roadhouse	September 1, 1976 (#76000364)	Mile 274.5 of Richardson Highway near the junction of the Delta and Tanana Rivers; 64°09′19″N 145°50′26″W	Big Delta	
10	Steele Creek Roadhouse	Steele Creek Roadhouse	April 29, 1980 (#80004576)	South side of Fortymile River, about 24 miles (39 km) northeast of Chicken, Alaska; 64°16′17″N 141°17′14″W	Chicken	
11	Sullivan Roadhouse	Sullivan Roadhouse	August 10, 1979 (#79003756)	266 Richardson Highway; 64°02′08″N 145°43′51″W	Delta Junction	
12	Swan Point Archaeological Site	Swan Point Archaeological Site	September 26, 2008 (#08000929)	Northern edge of the Shaw Creek Flats, 90 kilometres (56 mi) southeast of Fairbanks; 63°18′00″N 146°02′00″W	Big Delta	

== See also ==
- List of National Historic Landmarks in Alaska
- National Register of Historic Places listings in Alaska
