= Steele Creek =

Steele Creek may refer to:

- Steele Creek, Alaska, a census-designated place near Fairbanks, Alaska
- Steeles Creek, Kentucky
- Steele Creek (Mohawk River tributary), a tributary of the Mohawk River in New York
- Steele Creek (Charlotte neighborhood), a neighborhood of Charlotte, North Carolina
  - Steele Creek Presbyterian Church and Cemetery, a historic site in the neighborhood
- Steele Creek (Hardin County, Tennessee), a stream
- Steele Creek Roadhouse, a historic site in Alaska
- Steele Creek Trail, a trail in Melbourne, Australia

== See also ==
- Steel Creek (disambiguation)
