= Sullivan Roadhouse =

- U.S. National Register of Historic Places
- Alaska Heritage Resources Survey
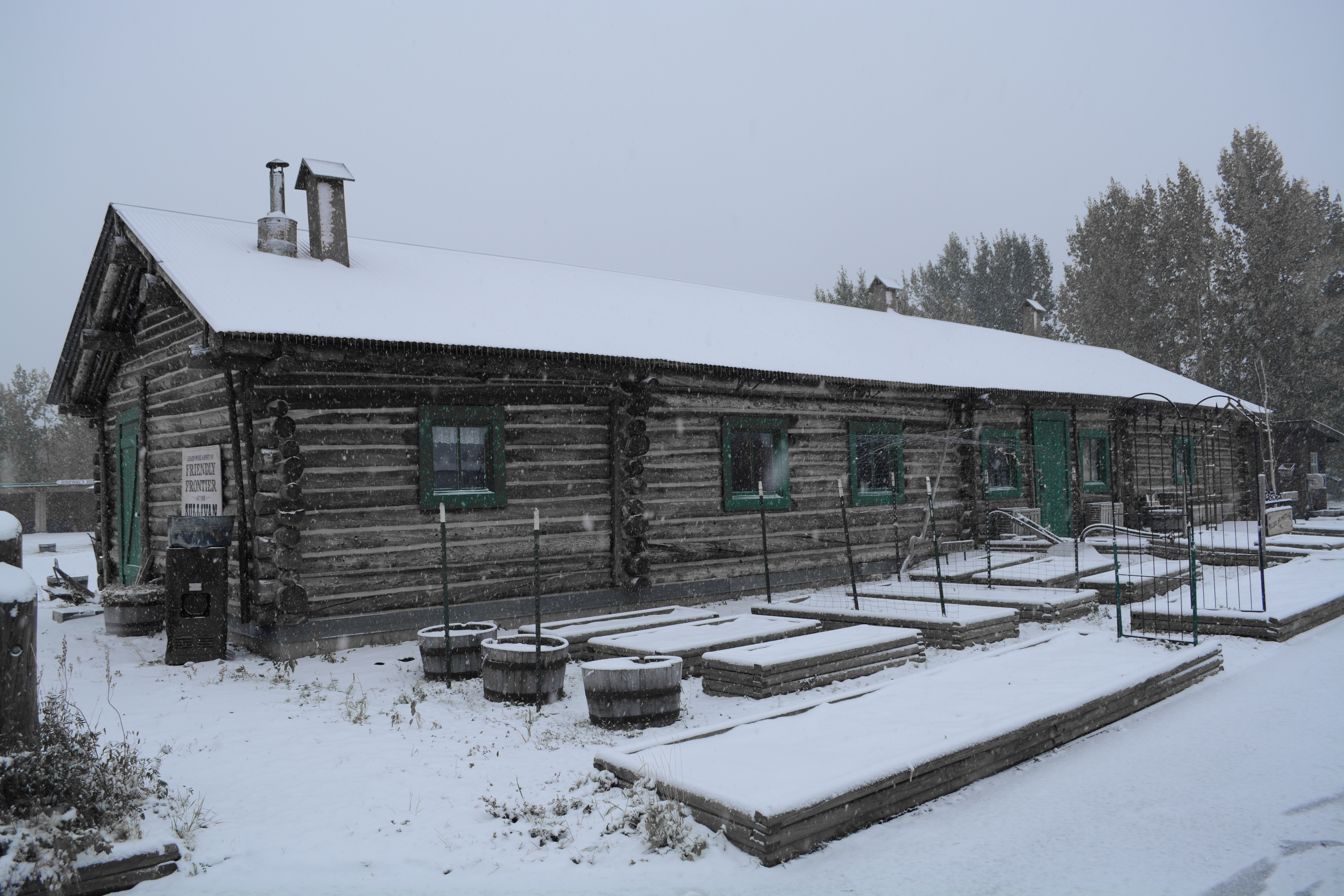

- Location within Alaska
- Location: 266 Richardson Highway, Delta Junction, Alaska
- Coordinates: 64°02′08″N 145°43′51″W
- Area: less than one acre
- Built: 1906
- Built by: John E. Sullivan
- NRHP reference No.: 79003756
- AHRS No.: XBD-177
- Added to NRHP: August 10, 1979

The Sullivan Roadhouse is a restored historic traveler's accommodation, operated as a museum in Delta Junction, Alaska, United States. The roadhouse was added to the National Register of Historic Places in 1979.

== History ==
The roadhouse was originally built in 1907-1908 by John Sullivan and his wife along the banks of Delta Creek, on the path of a winter cutoff of the main trail between Valdez and Fairbanks. Used by the Valdez-Fairbanks Winter Stage Line, frozen stream crossings in the winter months allowed a savings of 35 miles from the main trail, which was used by prospectors and others traveling north to the gold fields. The roadhouse was originally located along Delta Creek near a gravel airstrip (64°01′23″N 146°23′13″W). It was operated by the Sullivans until about 1922, when the Alaska Railway became the dominant means of transport in the region and the Alaska Road Commission (ARC) stopped maintaining the cut-off. The Sullivans died four months apart in 1924, the ARC officially abandoned the cut-off in 1925.

The site and the unused buildings were annexed by Fort Greely during World War II, on what became the northwest boundary of the Oklahoma Bombing Range. The roadhouse was at one time a complex of five buildings, including an outhouse, smithy, and barn, but only the main portion of the principal structure survived into the 1990s. All of the buildings were of log construction, but only the main house was roofed with corrugated metal. The others had sod roofs, which gave way over time.

The roadhouse was listed on the National Register of Historic Places in 1979 for its role as a winter stop on the stage line and as one of the few remaining log roadhouses from its time.

== Preservation ==
The roadhouse 2 acres (0.81 ha) area was not easily accessible by the public due to its remote location, lack of a public road, and the possibility of un-exploded ordnance from the nearby bombing range. The Bureau of Land Management, the U.S. Army, and local historians moved the building into Delta Junction in 1997. The original building was disassembled, and a combination of new and original logs were used to rebuild it in its new location next to the visitors center. The roof and windows were replaced. Now known as the Sullivan Roadhouse Historical Museum, it is owned and operated by Delta Junction Chamber of Commerce.

== See also ==
- National Register of Historic Places listings in Southeast Fairbanks Census Area, Alaska
