= Chicken Historic District =

Historic district in Alaska, United States

- U.S. National Register of Historic Places
- U.S. Historic district
- Alaska Heritage Resources Survey
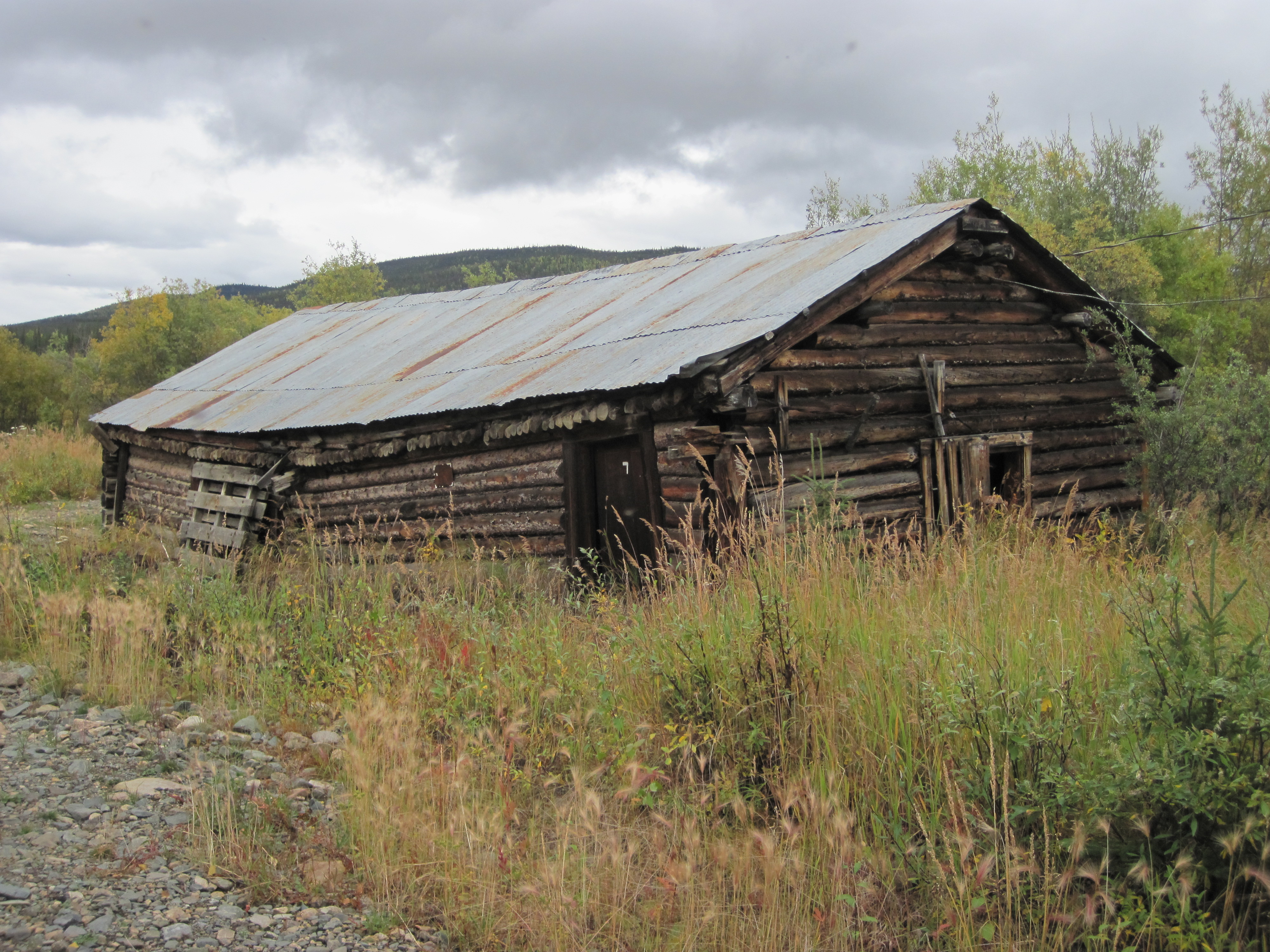

- Location within Alaska
- Location: Mile 66.5 of Taylor Highway
- Nearest city: Chicken, Alaska
- Coordinates: 64°04′29″N 141°55′56″W
- Area: 3 acres (1.2 ha)
- Built: 1908
- NRHP reference No.: 01001053
- AHRS No.: EAG-00008
- Added to NRHP: September 30, 2001

The Chicken Historic District encompasses part of the historic mining district of Chicken in the US state of Alaska. The roughly 3 acres (1.2 ha) area along the Taylor Highway preserves about 15 wood-frame and log buildings erected between 1908 and 1967 during the town’s gold-mining peak. It includes bunkhouses, roadhouses, and sections of the historic pipeline that carried water from Mosquito Creek for mining operations. The "Pedro Dredge", originally built in 1938, transferred to Chicken in 1959, and used until 1967, was moved to its current site in 1998. In 2006, it gained individual listing on the National Register of Historic Places and now forms the centerpiece of Chicken Gold Camp, drawing heritage tourism.

== History ==
Gold was discovered on Upper Chicken Creek in 1896, and by 1896–1898 around 700 miners were working the area. In 1902, when establishing a post office, miners chose "Chicken" as the name after failing to agree on the spelling of ptarmigan, the local bird. Between 1906 and 1925, structures like the Chicken Creek Roadhouse served travelers and locals, of which many of these buildings remain in the Historic District.

== Geography ==
The district is situated beside Chicken Creek near its confluence with the South Fork of the Fortymile River, approximately at mile 66.5 on the Taylor Highway in Alaska. The district was listed on the National Register of Historic Places in 2001. The surrounding boreal forest and muskeg host moose, bears, caribou, and diverse birds—often spotted during hikes or river excursions.

== Demographics and economy ==
The population peaked at around 400 in 1903, dwindling to about 7–12 year-round residents today, though summertime sees visitor numbers and seasonal residents rise to 20–100. Active small-scale mining continues, anchored by the historic Pedro Dredge. Seasonal tourism—gold-panning, tours, mining lore—supplements the income of the locals. The town has a café, saloon, campgrounds, and the annual Chickenstock music festival in June draw additional tourists. There are about 15 wood-frame and log buildings erected between 1908 and 1967 during the town’s gold-mining peak. It includes bunkhouses, roadhouses, and sections of the historic pipeline that carried water from Mosquito Creek for mining operations. The "Pedro Dredge", originally built in 1938, transferred to Chicken in 1959, and used until 1967, was moved to its current site in 1998.

== See also ==
- National Register of Historic Places listings in Southeast Fairbanks Census Area, Alaska
