= F. E. Company Dredge No. 4 =

- F.E. Company Dredge No. 4
- U.S. National Register of Historic Places
- Alaska Heritage Resources Survey
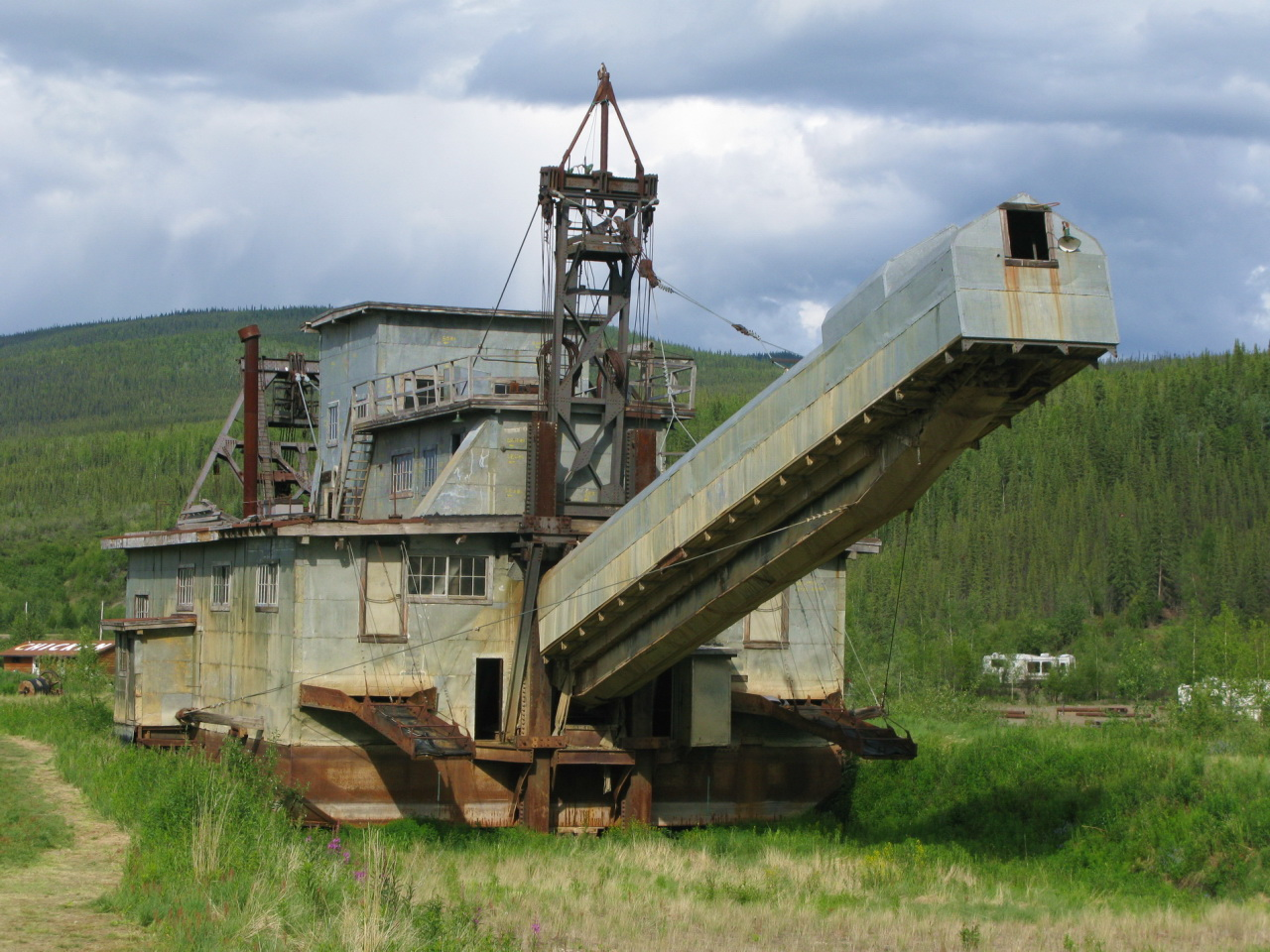

- Location within Alaska
- Location: Along Airport Road, south of mile 66.4 of Taylor Highway, Chicken, Alaska
- Coordinates: 64°04′11″N 141°56′19″W
- Area: less than one acre
- Built: 1938
- Built by: Yuba Manufacturing Company
- NRHP reference No.: 06000435
- AHRS No.: EAG-00069
- Added to NRHP: May 18, 2006

The F.E. Company Dredge No. 4, also known as the Pedro Dredge and the Chicken Dredge, was originally owned by the Fairbanks Exploration Company (F.E. Co.), a subsidiary of the United States Smelting Refining & Mining Co. (USSR&M). It was built by the Yuba Manufacturing Company in California, and was shipped to Pedro Creek north of Fairbanks, Alaska in 1938. It was assembled there, and operated until 1958.

The following year it was disassembled, trucked to Chicken, Alaska and reassembled. The dredge commenced operations on lower Chicken Creek in September and worked for approximately five months every year thereafter until October 1967, when it produced its final cleanup.

In 1998, the 500 ton dredge was moved overland to its current location at the Chicken Gold Camp.

In 2006, the dredge was added to the National Register of Historic Places and was opened to the public.

== See also ==
- Chatanika gold dredge (Fairbanks)
- Coal Creek Historic Mining District
- Goldstream Dredge No. 8
- National Register of Historic Places listings in Southeast Fairbanks Census Area, Alaska
