= Steele Creek Roadhouse =

- U.S. National Register of Historic Places
- Alaska Heritage Resources Survey
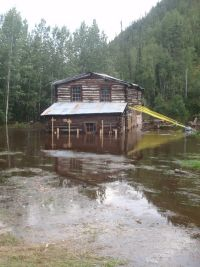
- The roadhouse during flooding in 2011

- Location within Alaska
- Location: South side of Fortymile River, about 24 miles (39 km) northeast of Chicken, Alaska
- Nearest city: Chicken, Alaska
- Coordinates: 64°16′17″N 141°17′14″W
- Area: 1 acre (0.40 ha)
- Built: 1898
- NRHP reference No.: 80004576
- AHRS No.: EAG-019

Significant dates
- Added to NRHP: April 29, 1980
- Designated AHRS: November 21, 1974

The Steele Creek Roadhouse is a historic roadhouse, post office, and trading post in east-central Alaska. It is located on the south side of the Fortymile River, at the mouth of Steele Creek, and is accessible via a hiking trail from mile 105 of the Taylor Highway, or by river access. It is a two-story log structure, 50 feet (15 m) wide and 25 feet (7.6 m) deep. Its first story was built c. 1898 by a man named Anderson, with the second story added in about 1910. It was on the main route between Eagle and Chicken between 1907 and 1951, serving travelers and local residents, until the Taylor Highway bypassed it. It underwent restoration in 2011.

The building was listed on the National Register of Historic Places in 1980.

== See also ==
- National Register of Historic Places listings in Southeast Fairbanks Census Area, Alaska
