= Steel Creek =

Steel Creek or Steels Creek may refer to:

- Steel Creek Township, Holt County, Nebraska
- Steel Creek (Niobrara River tributary), a stream in Holt and Knox Counties, Nebraska
- Steels Creek, Victoria

== See also ==
- Steele Creek (disambiguation)
