= John C. Gotwals =

American Army military engineer (1884–1946)

John Carl Gotwals
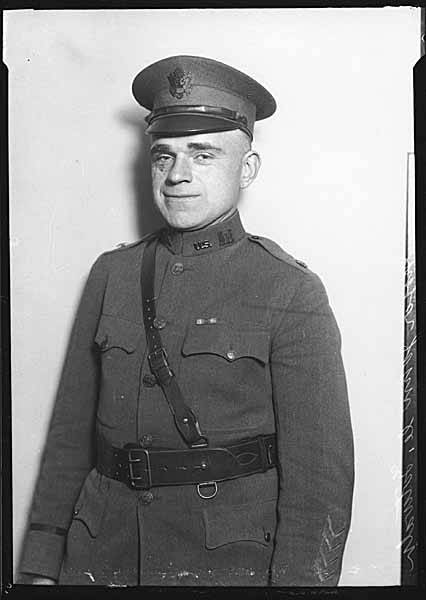
- Gotwals as a major in 1926
- Born: November 4, 1884; Yerkes, Pennsylvania, U.S.
- Died: January 15, 1946 (aged 61); Richmond Heights, Missouri, U.S.
- Burial place: Calvary Cemetery, St. Louis
- Education: Pennsylvania State College (B.S.)
- Spouses: Muriel Clemmons (m. 1927)

Engineer Commissioner of the District of Columbia
- In office July 21, 1930 – August 22, 1934
- President: Herbert Hoover
- Preceded by: Col. William B. Ladue
- Succeeded by: Col. Daniel I. Sultan
- Military career
- Branch: United States Army
- Service years: 1913–1934
- Rank: Lieutenant Colonel
- Unit: Corps of Engineers
- Conflicts: World War I
- Awards: Distinguished Service Medal

John Carl Gotwals (November 4, 1884 – January 15, 1946) was an American military engineer. His long career in the Corps of Engineers included a term (1930–1934) as the Engineer Commissioner of the District of Columbia.

== Early life ==
Gotwals was the son of Abraham G. Gotwals (1850–1911) and Mary Carroll Logan Gotwals (1859–1943); he had at least four siblings, three of whom were older. He graduated from Pennsylvania State College in 1906 with a B.S. degree in civil engineering. Continuing graduate studies at Penn State, he earned a Civil Engineer degree in 1907. Gotwals then worked as a civil engineer for the Pennsylvania Railroad and the Catskill Aqueduct. In March 1913, he joined the army as a probationary second lieutenant; from 1915 to 1917, he was a student at the Army Engineer School in Washington.

== Career ==
In 1917, Gotwals was sent to France in command of a special unit of students from the Washington, D.C. Bliss School of Electricity, tasked with teaching the use of searchlights. Gotwals was raised to the rank of lieutenant colonel and was in 1922 awarded a Distinguished Service Medal for his work there. After World War I, he accepted a reduction in rank to major to remain in active service. He served on the Alaska Engineering Commission and the Alaska Road Commission, serving as president of the latter for a time in 1920. He then completed his studies at the Army Engineer School, graduating in 1921. In 1922, he was called in to investigate the Knickerbocker Theatre roof collapse in Washington, DC. He also served in engineering posts in Mississippi and, from 1924 to 1930, in St. Louis, Missouri.

On July 21, 1930, he was appointed as the Corps of Engineers representative on the three-person Board of Commissioners in charge of the District of Columbia; he served until August 22, 1934. He also served on the district's Public Utilities Commission. Gotwals was ill for much of his term and was replaced in 1934 due to his impending retirement for health reasons. He was raised again to the rank of lieutenant colonel upon his retirement on September 30, 1934.

Gotwals was a member of the American Society of Military Engineers and the American Society of Civil Engineers.

== Personal life ==
Gotwals married Muriel Clemens (1900–1989) on November 10, 1927. He died at St. Mary's Hospital in Richmond Heights, Missouri near St. Louis on January 15, 1946.
