= Goldstream Dredge No. 8 =

- U.S. National Register of Historic Places
- U.S. Historic district
- Alaska Heritage Resources Survey
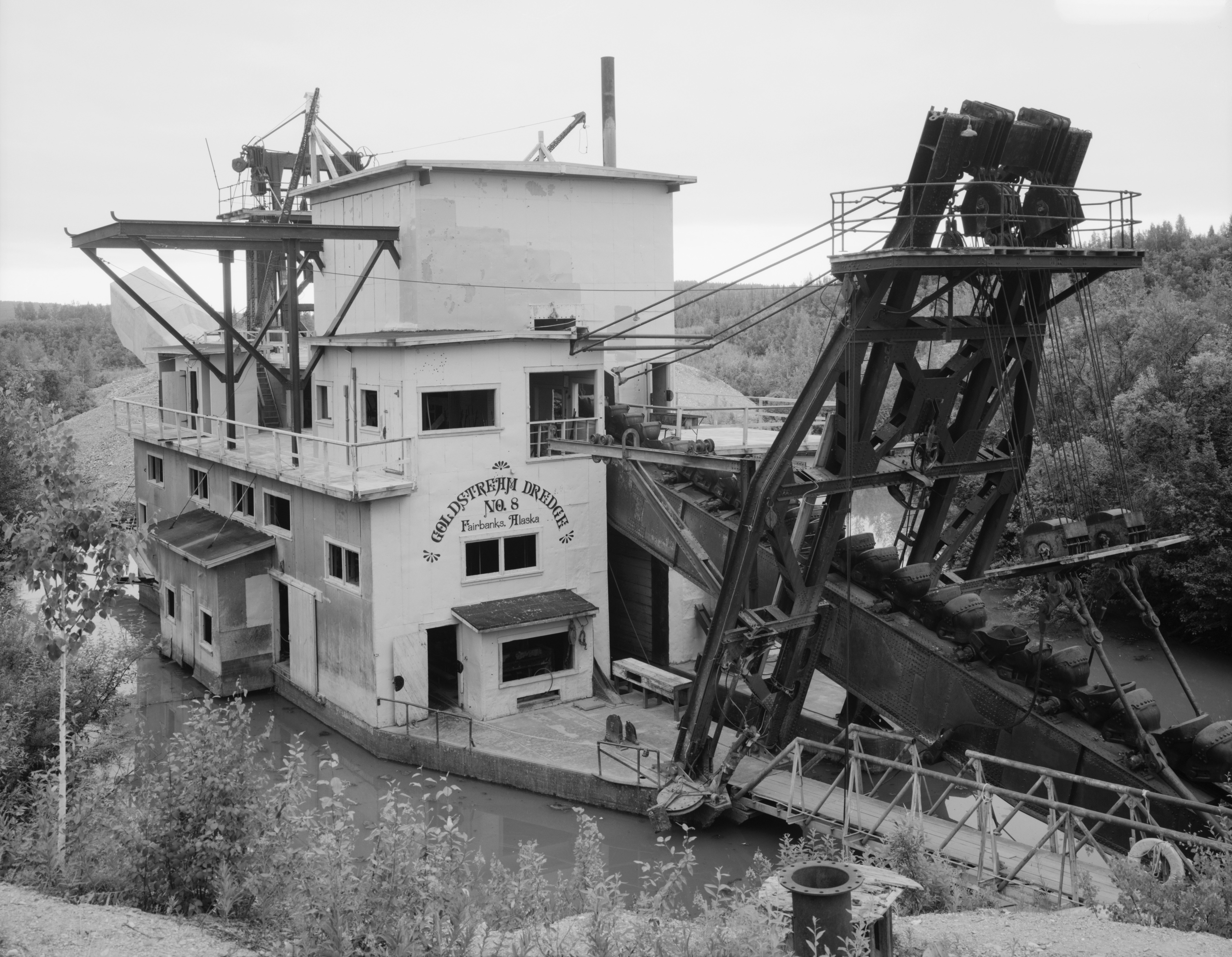
- Goldstream Dredge No. 8

- Location within Alaska
- Location: South bank of Engineer Creek, along Steese Highway
- Nearest city: Fairbanks, Alaska
- Coordinates: 64°56′14″N 147°39′28″W
- Area: 1 acre (0.40 ha)
- Built: 1927
- Built by: Fairbanks Exploration Company; Bethlehem Steel Corporation
- NRHP reference No.: 84000637
- AHRS No.: FAI-003

Significant dates
- Added to NRHP: February 28, 1984
- Designated AHRS: July 29, 1971

Goldstream Dredge No. 8 is a ladder dredge operated by the Fairbanks Exploration Company from 1928 to 1959. It is located on the old Steese Highway between Fairbanks and Fox in the central part of Alaska.

Starting in the 1920s, water was brought to the area through the 90-mile (145 km) Davidson Ditch for gold mining. The Goldstream Dredge No. 8 cut a 4.5-mile (7.2 km) track and produced 7.5 million ounces of gold.

The dredge was named a Historic Mechanical Engineering Landmark by the American Society of Mechanical Engineers in 1986. In 1984, it was listed as a historic district on the National Register of Historic Places.

Today, it is open to the public. During summer months, tours of the dredge and gold panning are available for a small fee.

== See also ==
- National Register of Historic Places listings in Fairbanks North Star Borough, Alaska
- Chatanika gold dredge (Fairbanks)
- Coal Creek Historic Mining District
- F. E. Company Dredge No. 4
