= Igloo Creek Cabin No. 25 =

- U.S. National Register of Historic Places
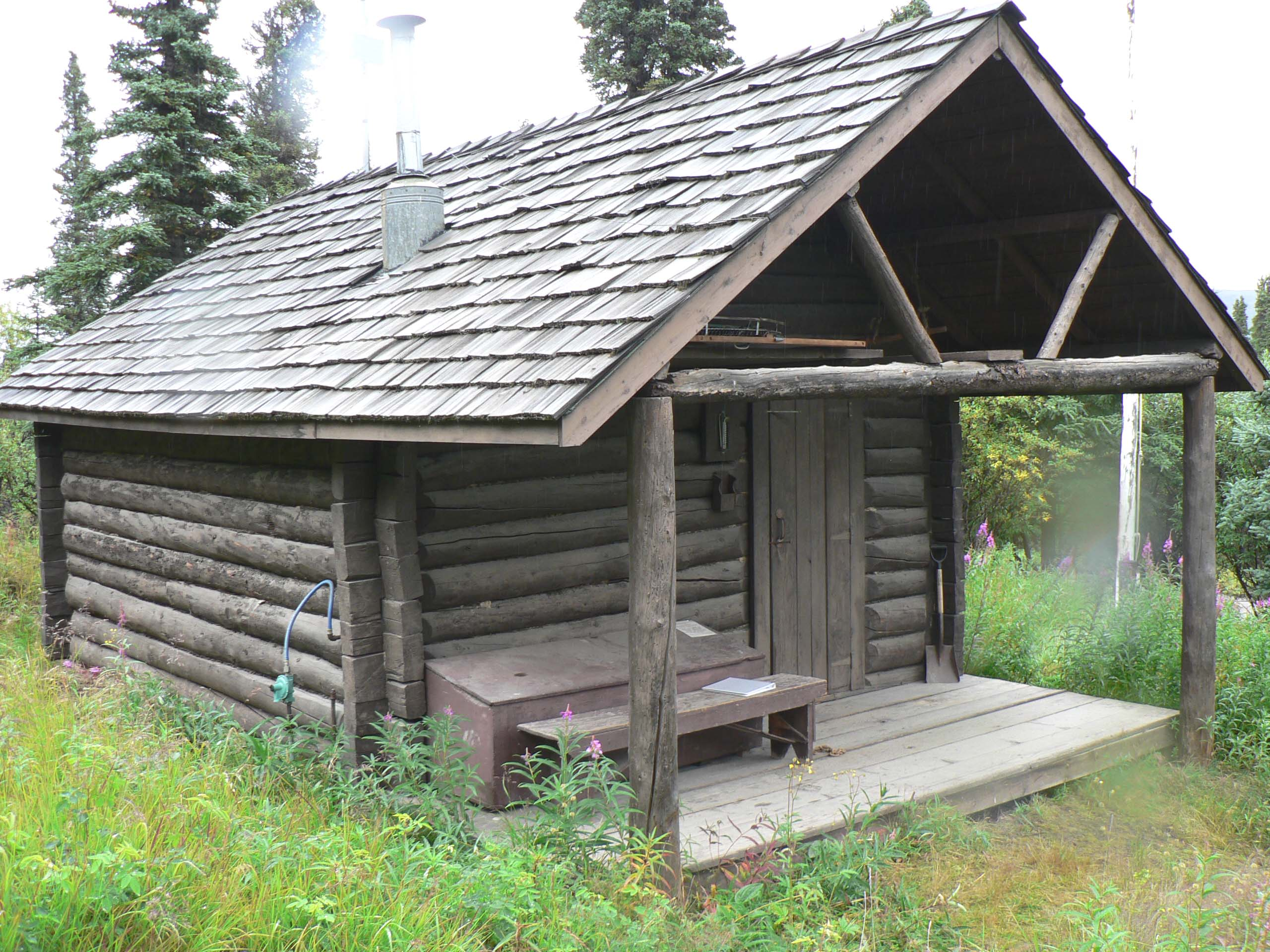

- Location within Alaska
- Location: Near Igloo Creek at Mile 34.1, north of Park Road, Denali National Park and Preserve, Alaska
- Coordinates: 63°36′33″N 149°35′2″W
- Area: less than one acre
- Built: 1928
- Built by: Alaska Road Commission; National Park Service
- MPS: Patrol Cabins, Mount McKinley National Park TR
- NRHP reference No.: 86003208
- Added to NRHP: November 25, 1986

Igloo Creek Patrol Cabin No. 25 is a log shelter in the National Park Service Rustic style in Denali National Park. Originally built by the Alaska Road Commission, it was the site of a summer construction camp, and was used for supply storage. The cabin is now part of a network of shelters used by patrolling park rangers throughout the park. It is a standard design by the National Park Service Branch of Plans and Designs and was built in 1928.
