= John Hajdukovich =

Pioneer in Alaska

John Hajdukovich Jovan Hajduković
- Born: 15 November 1879; Utrg, Principality of Montenegro
- Died: 18 July 1965 (aged 85); Fairbanks, Alaska, U.S.
- Occupations: Politician, miner, salesman

John Hajdukovich, born as Jovan Hajduković, (1879–1965) was a Montenegrin American pioneer in Alaska, who ran several trading posts around Big Delta and was a member of the Alaska Game Commission. He immigrated to Alaska in 1903 and worked as a miner, trapper, and guide. In 1906 Hajdukovich bought the roadhouse in Big Delta and enlarged it, and later sold it to Rika Wallen, who worked for him. In 1928 his observations and experience in the Big Delta country was the basis for the relocation of the bison herd from Montana that lives there.
