= Alaska Road Commission =

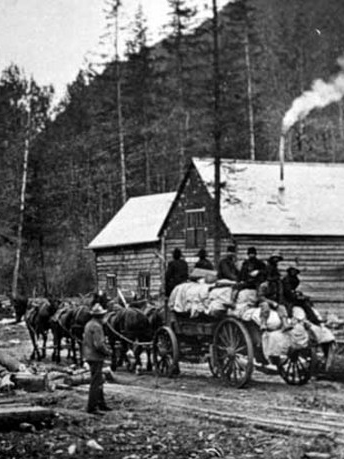
ARC workers on the Valdez-Eagle trail, ca. 1913

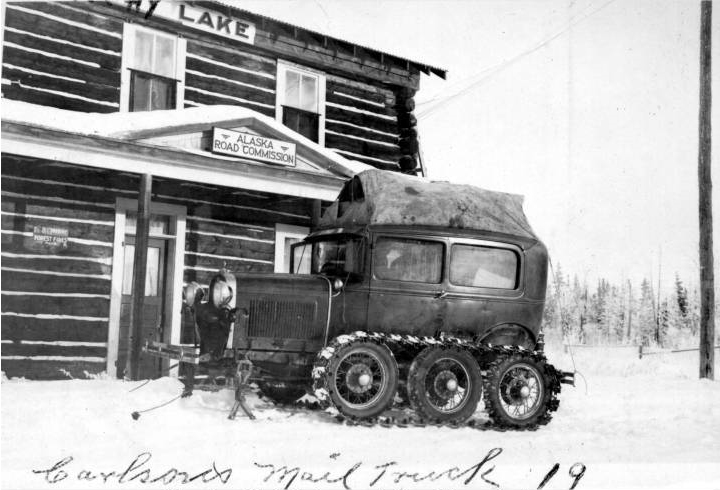
Carlson's mail truck. 1919.

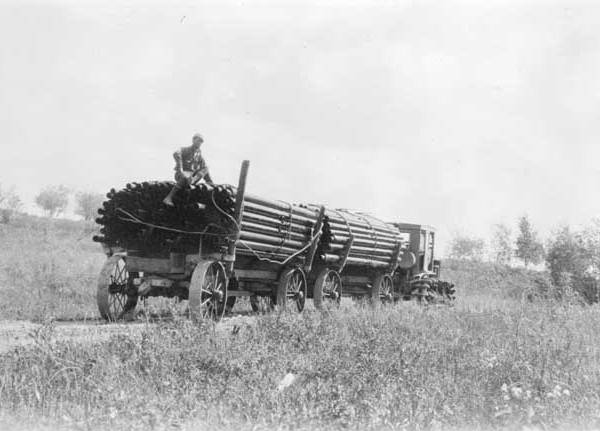
Tractor hauling wagons on Yukon Highway near Goldstream. 1928

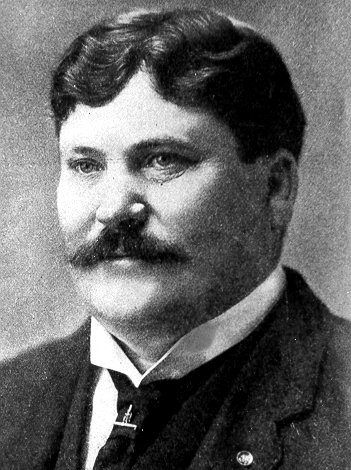
Wilds P. Richardson, first president of the ARC (1905–1917)

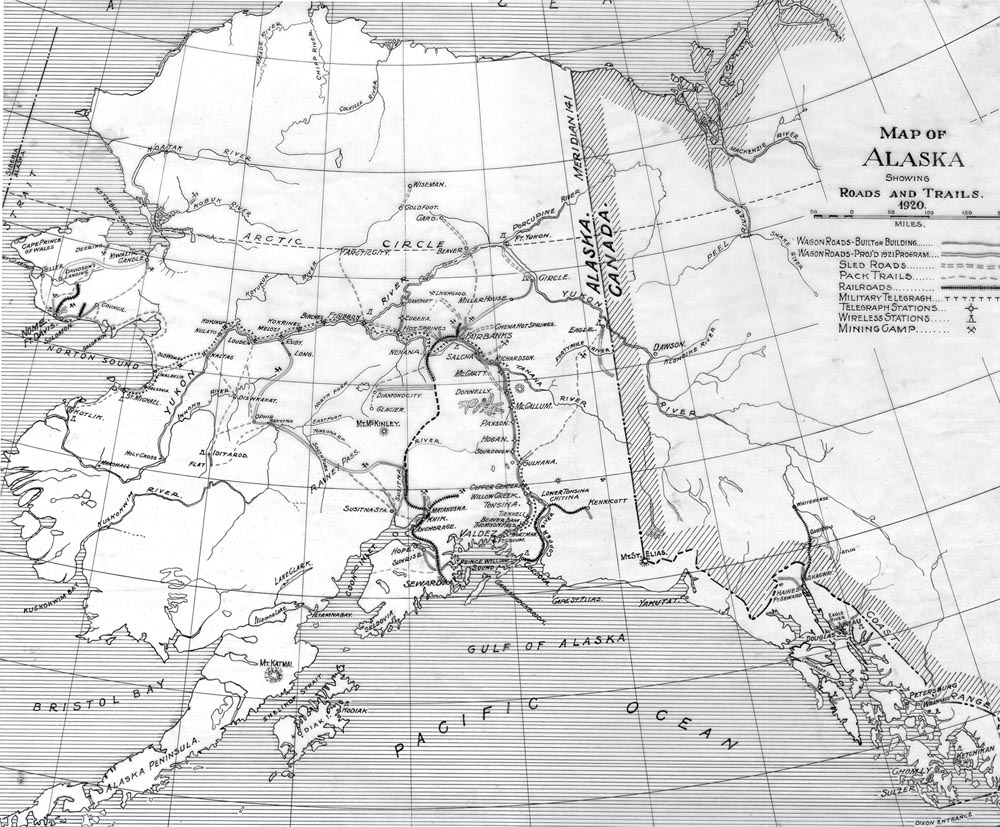
Roads, trails, telegraph lines and railways of Alaska, circa 1920

The Board of Road Commissioners for Alaska, more commonly known as the Alaska Road Commission or ARC, was created in 1905 as a board of the U.S. War Department. It was responsible for the construction and improvement of many important Alaska highways, such as the Richardson Highway, Steese Highway, Elliot Highway and Edgerton Highway, among others.

The commission was transferred to the Department of the Interior in 1932, and was absorbed by the Bureau of Public Roads, a division of the Commerce Department in 1956. Today, responsibility for road development and maintenance in Alaska lies with the Alaska Department of Transportation & Public Facilities.

== Background and motivation ==
The Alaska Interior was largely roadless up until about the 1870s, with only a network of trails established by the native people of Alaska, which Russian, and later American, traders and prospectors used as well. The Russians in Alaska stuck to coastal regions, and built almost no new trails or roads during their time of possession (1741 to 1867), and early mining, such as near Sitka was close to the coast. In the 1870s and 1880s, spurred by increased settlement and prospecting, some settlers began making arrangements with the natives, improving trails and in some cases imposing tolls, such as on the Dalton Trail.

Prospectors and others wished for an easier overland route between a year-round port in southern Alaska and the Yukon River. The US Army began surveying and determined the best route would be north from Valdez. The Army started construction of a pack trail from Valdez to Eagle in 1898. By 1899 this project was also known as the Trans-Alaska Military Road. In the early 1900s congressional committees investigating transportation needs in Alaska, including a 1903 visit by a Senate committee on Territories, recommended that the War Department construct a trail system and upgrade the newly built Valdez-Eagle trail to a wagon road. Congress approved legislation establishing a commission to oversee these and other improvements on January 27, 1905, and the Board of Road Commissioners for Alaska, generally referred to as the Alaska Road Commission (ARC), was organized May 15, 1905, by order of the secretary of war.

== Structure and operations ==
The ARC had three members, as follows;

The chairman or president of the board, in overall charge of operations, an engineer officer with fieldwork responsibility, and a secretary and disbursing officer who ran the office proper and paid for work executed. The Department of War at the time was in charge of the US Army and many of the board members were US Army officers, including the first chairman, Brigadier General Wilds P. Richardson. Initially, the board reported directly to the War Department through the Army Adjutant General but on December 29, 1917, supervision was transferred to the chief of engineers, the head of the United States Army Corps of Engineers.

Funding for commission operations was initially intended to come from 70 percent of the business license fees (Federal vocational and trade license taxes) from areas outside incorporated towns. However this funding source was sporadic and insufficient so it was supplemented with general congressional appropriations, with yearly appropriations initially running between $100,000 and $500,000. There was also a special tax imposed on residents of unincorporated areas of 2 days labor at road building, or 8 USD cash to fund construction. In 1912, after Alaska became a territory this was revised to $4 but was levied against all Alaska residents. This resulted in a mix of about 60–70% congressional appropriation and 30–40% territorial funding.

In 1914 the Territorial Legislature set up road districts with elected road commissioners but this did not last. Shortly thereafter, in 1917, the Territorial Legislature set up a Territorial Board of Road Commissioners and 4 regional boards. These boards tended to approve projects and give funding to the ARC to carry them out, and the head of the territorial boards were sometimes the superintendents of the relevant ARC district, and the chairman of the Territorial Board was often the chairman of the ARC.

From its formation, the ARC also had subcontracted responsibility from the Department of Agriculture for road maintenance in the Tongass and Chugach national forests, but in 1922 this was transferred to the Department of the Interior's Bureau of Public Roads, which then took on construction of roads and trails in the forests.

== Scope of work ==
The ARC got busy quickly, by 1907 the commission had flagged 247 miles (398 km) of winter trails on the Seward Peninsula, built 40 miles (64 km) of road, upgraded 200 miles of existing trails, and cleared 285 miles (459 km) of new trail. A significant project was construction of a spur trail from Gulkana on the Valdez-Eagle route to the new mining camp of Fairbanks. By 1922 these numbers had grown to 1,101 miles (1,772 km) of wagon road including 600 miles (966 km) of gravel surfaced roads, 756 miles (1,217 km) of winter sled roads, 3,721 miles (5,988 km) of permanent trail and 712 miles (1,146 km) of temporary flagged trail. By 1932 the ARC had built and maintained 1,231 miles (1,981 km) of roads, 74 miles (119 km) of tram road, 1,495 miles (2,406 km) of sled roads, 4,732 miles (7,615 km) of trails, 329 miles (529 km) of temporary flagged trails, 26 airfields, and 32 shelter cabins. Total expenditures were in excess of $18 million.

The ARC did not favor use of these trails by trucks or automobiles, declaring in 1914 that it made "no pretense of having built roads adapted for automobile travel", nevertheless by 1922 90% of the summer traffic was with motorized vehicles. Typical initial construction standards were 10-foot (3 m) width for light traffic trails and 16 feet (5 m) for heavier traffic trails, usually just graded through the countryside. In permafrost areas corduroy road construction techniques were used. Small streams were bridged with culverts. Initially larger streams were forded or had ferries provided (such as the ferry across the Tanana at Rika's Landing), but as time and funds permitted, larger bridging projects were carried out, such as the 450-foot (137 m) bridge across the Tazlina River, and the 420-foot (128 m) bridge across the Tonsina River.

== Following years ==
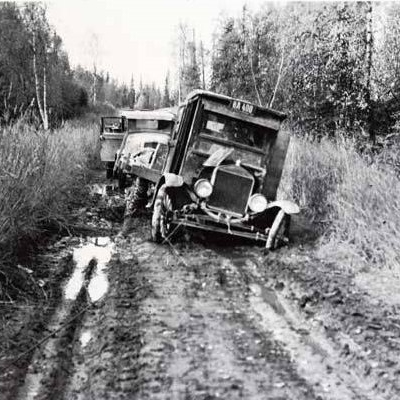
Vehicle being towed out of the mud, 1939, Alaska Route 51, mile 16 (shows problematic roads)

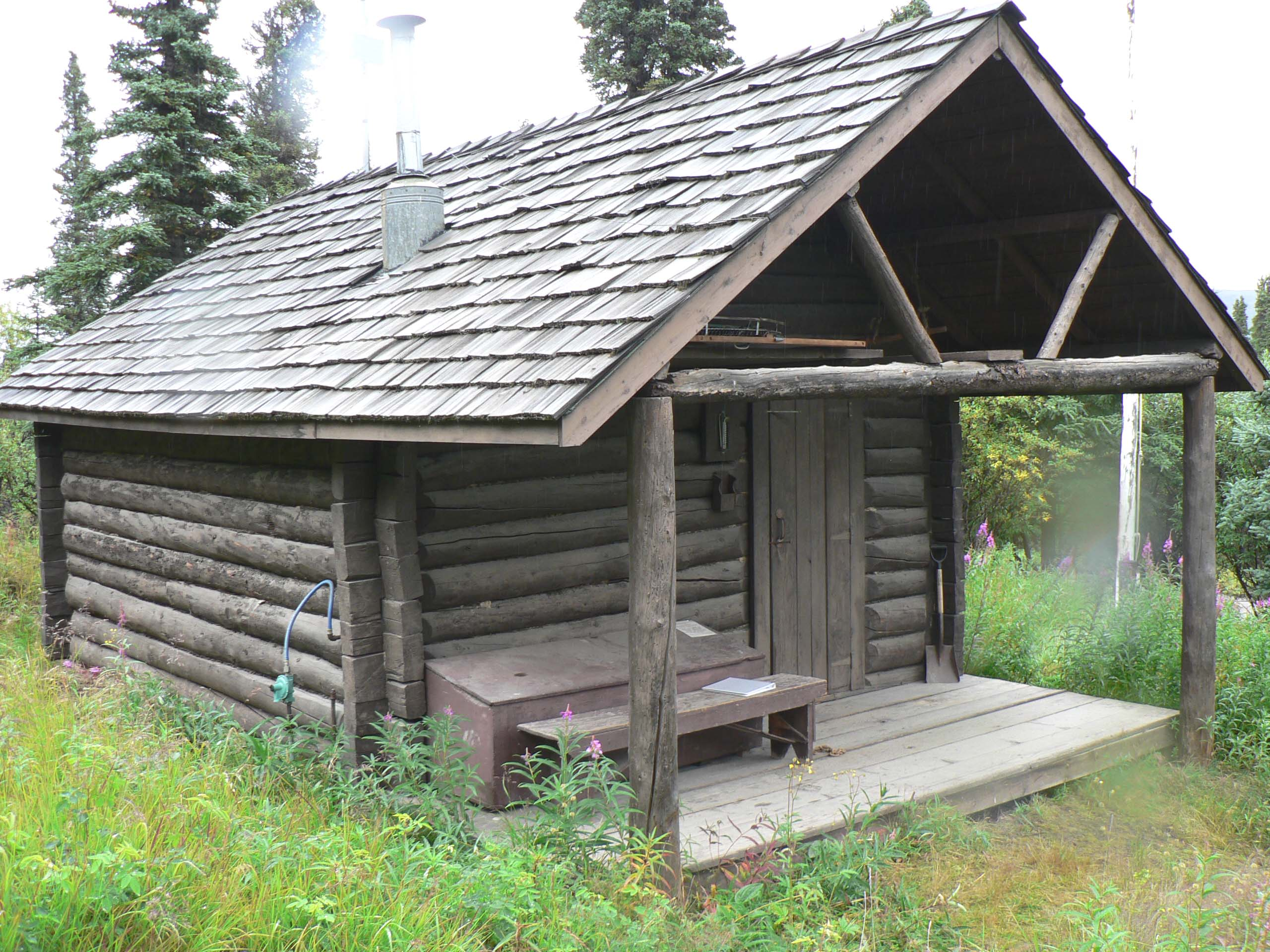
The ARC built many shelter cabins, such as this one, Igloo Creek Cabin No. 25 now in Denali National Park and Preserve

In 1932 the Alaska Road Commission was transferred to the Department of the Interior. The Interior Department imposed registration and license fee requirements on all vehicles in Alaska, which many vehicle operators ignored. In addition, a toll was collected from commercial vehicles on the Richardson Highway. The Interior Department also operated the Alaska Railroad, and in a controversial bid to move traffic to the railroad, the tolls were increased to between $100 and $175. The commercial freighters did not like this toll and evaded it by various means. By 1940, a pirate ferry (complete with skull and crossbones flag) was operating at Big Delta, Alaska, at the Tanana River crossing, with incidents such as seizing the local Deputy Marshal resulting. The government was unable to enforce the law, with at least one grand jury in Fairbanks refusing to return indictments, finding the tax discriminatory. Finally in 1942, Interior Secretary Harold L. Ickes repealed the toll.

The ARC remained with the Department of the Interior until 1956 when it was absorbed by the Bureau of Public Roads, then a division of the Commerce Department. which later evolved into the Federal Highway Administration. The ARC operated as usual, federally managed, until 1960. With the advent of statehood in 1959 the State of Alaska assumed road building and maintenance responsibility, but contracted to the ARC for the work. However, in 1960, the state ended the agreement with the Bureau of Public Roads, and the ARC was transferred to the state, becoming the Alaska State Highway Department.

== Legacy ==
The ARC left a lasting mark on the development of Alaska. Many of Alaska's most important and historic highways are named for Road Commission officers instrumental in their construction, including

- Richardson Highway, named for Brigadier General Wilds P. Richardson
- Steese Highway, named for Colonel James G. Steese
- Elliott Highway, named for Major Malcolm Elliott
- Edgerton Highway, named for Major General Glen E. Edgerton
- Taylor Highway, named for ARC President (1932–1948) Ike P. Taylor

In addition signs of the work of the ARC can still be seen, for example some of the shelter cabins built by the ARC during the construction of the Denali Park Road are still in use as ranger patrol cabins by National Park Service rangers in Denali National Park and Preserve.

== Notable people ==
=== ARC presidents ===
- 1905-1917 Wilds P. Richardson
- 1917-1920 William H. Waugh
- 1920-1920 John C. Gotwals
- 1920-1927 James G. Steese
- 1927-1932 Malcolm Elliott
- 1932-1948 Ike P. Taylor
- 1948-1951 John R. Noyes
- 1951-1956 Angelo F. Ghiglione
