= Chicken Airport =

Airport in Alaska, U.S.

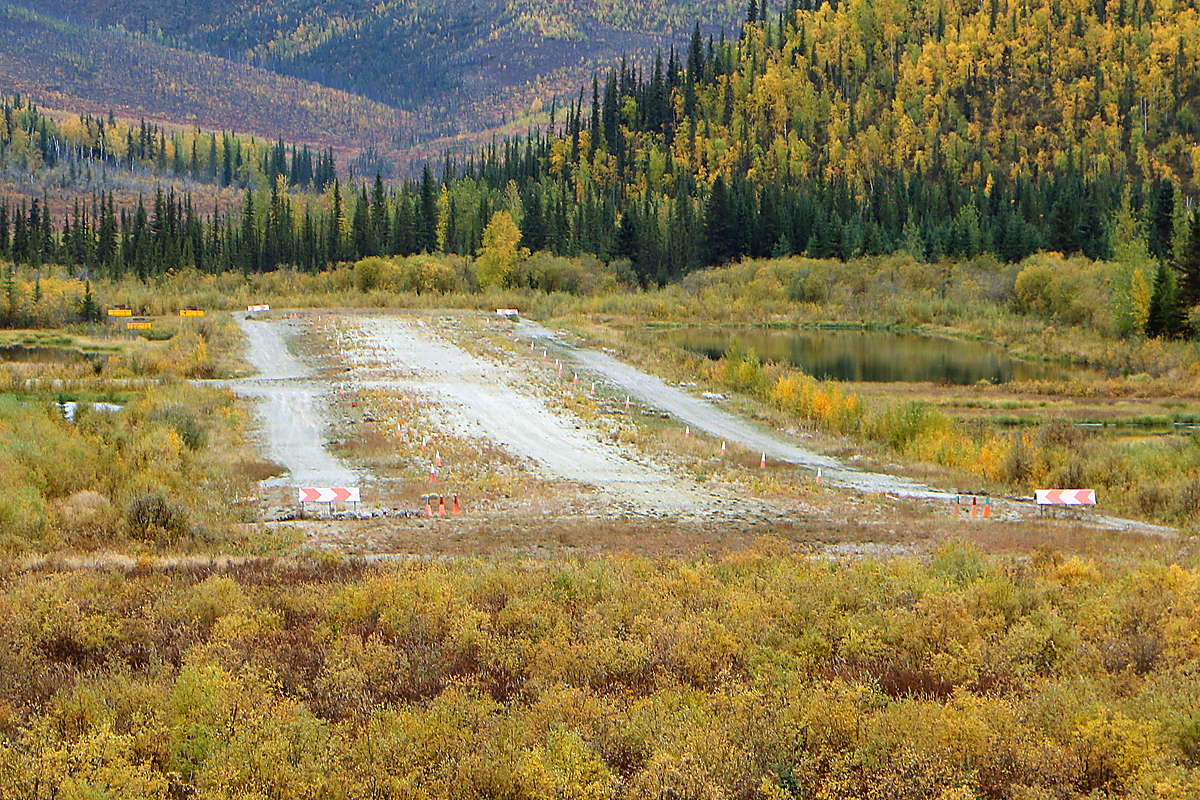
- IATA: CKX; ICAO: PAAY; FAA LID: CKX

Summary
- Airport type: Public
- Owner: Alaska DOT&PF - Northern Region
- Serves: Chicken, Alaska
- Elevation AMSL: 1,640 ft (500 m)
- Coordinates: 64°04′17″N 141°57′08″W

Map
- Location of airport in Alaska

Runways
Direction	Length		Surface
Direction	ft	m	Surface
13/31	2,500	762	Gravel/dirt

Statistics (2015)
- Aircraft operations: 475 (2014)
- Based aircraft: 0
- Passengers: 31
- Freight: 17,000 lbs
- Source: Federal Aviation Administration

Chicken Airport (IATA: CKX, ICAO: PAAY, FAA LID: CKX) is a state-owned public-use airport located in Chicken, a community in the Southeast Fairbanks Census Area of the U.S. state of Alaska. It is included in the FAA's National Plan of Integrated Airport Systems for 2011–2015, which categorized it as a general aviation facility. Both Boundary and Eagle destinations are flag stops on the Tok-Chicken route. The aircraft will not stop at these destinations unless there is scheduled cargo or passengers flying in or out of those destinations.

== Facilities and aircraft ==
Chicken Airport covers an area of 68 acres (28 ha) at an elevation of 1,640 feet (500 m) above mean sea level. It has one runway designated 13/31 with a gravel surface measuring 2,500 by 60 feet (762 x 18 m). For the 12-month period ending December 31, 2005, the airport had 475 aircraft operations, an average of 39 per month: 74% general aviation and 26% air taxi.

== Airlines and destinations ==
Airlines	Destinations
40-Mile Air	Tok

=== Statistics ===
Carrier shares: January – December 2015
Carrier	Passengers (arriving and departing)
40-Mile Air	31(100.00%)

Top domestic destinations: January – December 2015
Rank	City	Airport	Passengers	Carriers
1	(Alaska) Tok, AK	Tok Junction Airport	14	40-Mile Air

== See also ==
- List of airports in Alaska
