= Steeles Creek, Kentucky =

Unincorporated community in Kentucky, United States

- Unincorporated community
- Location within the state of Kentucky Steeles Creek (the United States)
- Coordinates: 38°50′6″N 84°48′53″W
- Country: United States
- State: Kentucky
- County: Gallatin
- Elevation: 502 ft (153 m)
- Time zone: UTC-6 (Central (CST))
  - Summer (DST): UTC-5 (CST)
- GNIS feature ID: 2558283

Steeles Creek was an unincorporated community located in Gallatin County, Kentucky, United States.
