= Steele Creek (Hardin County, Tennessee) =

Stream in Tennessee, U.S.

Coordinates: 35.2409138°N 88.1980907°W

Steele Creek is a stream in the U.S. state of Tennessee. It is a tributary to Horse Creek.

Steele Creek has the name of a pioneer settler. A variant name was Steeles Creek.
