= Wilds P. Richardson =

Officer of the United States army

Wilds Preston Richardson
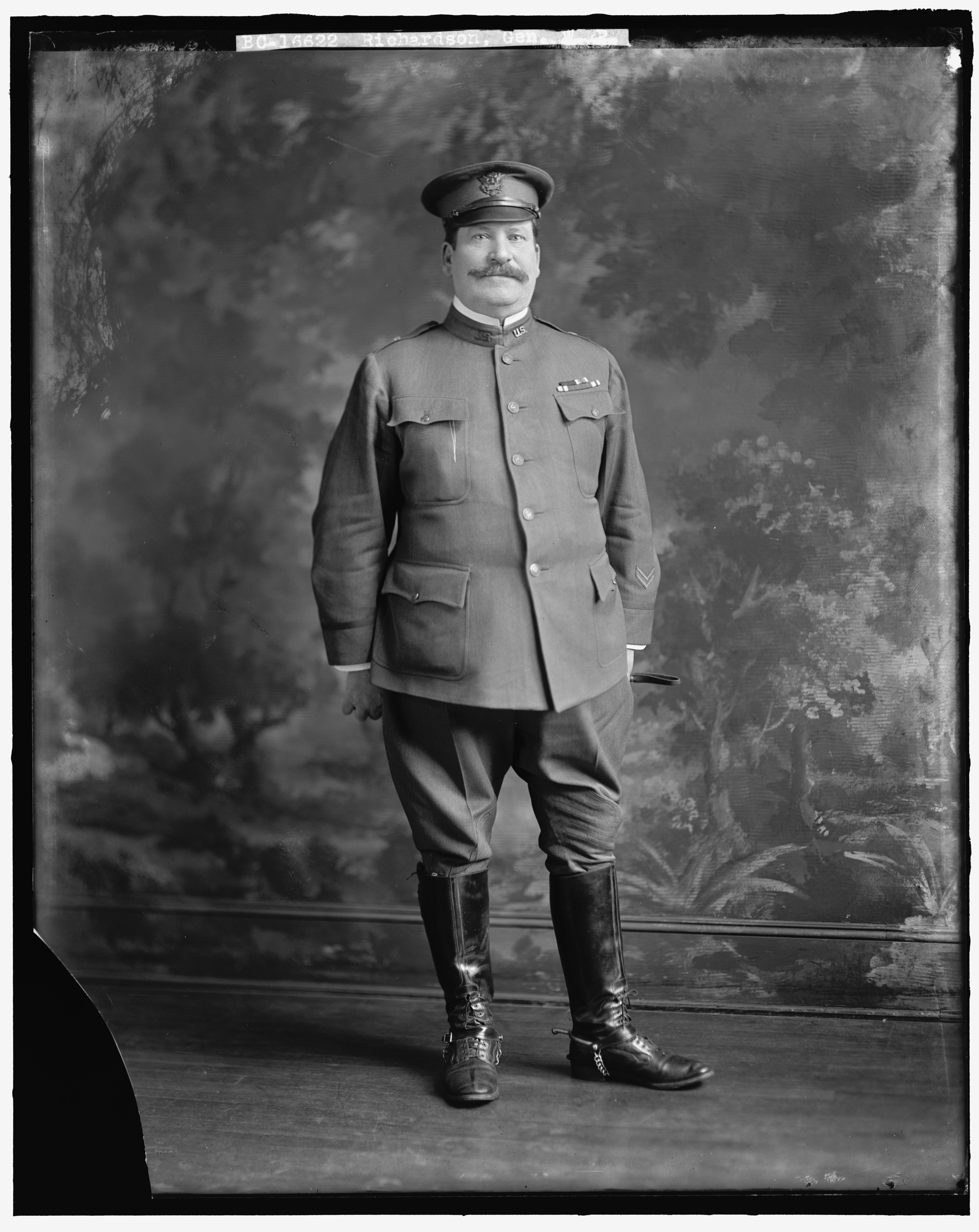
- Born: March 20, 1861; Hunt County, Texas, Confederate States of America
- Died: May 20, 1929 (aged 68); Washington D.C., United States of America
- Military career
- Branch: United States Army
- Service years: 1884–1920
- Rank: Brigadier General
- Commands: 5th Infantry Division; American North Russian Expeditionary Forces; 78th Infantry Brigade; Alaska Road Commission
- Conflicts: World War I: Western Front; Russian Civil War: North Russia intervention

Wilds Preston Richardson (20 March 1861 in Hunt County, Texas – 20 May 1929) was an officer of the United States Army notable for being an explorer and geographer of Alaska in the early decades of the 20th century. During World War I, he was promoted to the rank of brigadier general and, because of his cold weather experience, sent to lead the Polar Bear Expedition, part of the Allied intervention in the Russian Civil War. Richardson retired after the war and died in Washington, D.C., in 1929.

== Early life and education ==
Richardson was born on 20 March 1861 to Oliver P. and Hester F. (Wingo) Richardson in Hunt County, Texas. After attending schools in that county, the younger Richardson received an appointment to attend the United States Military Academy at West Point in 1880.

== Career ==
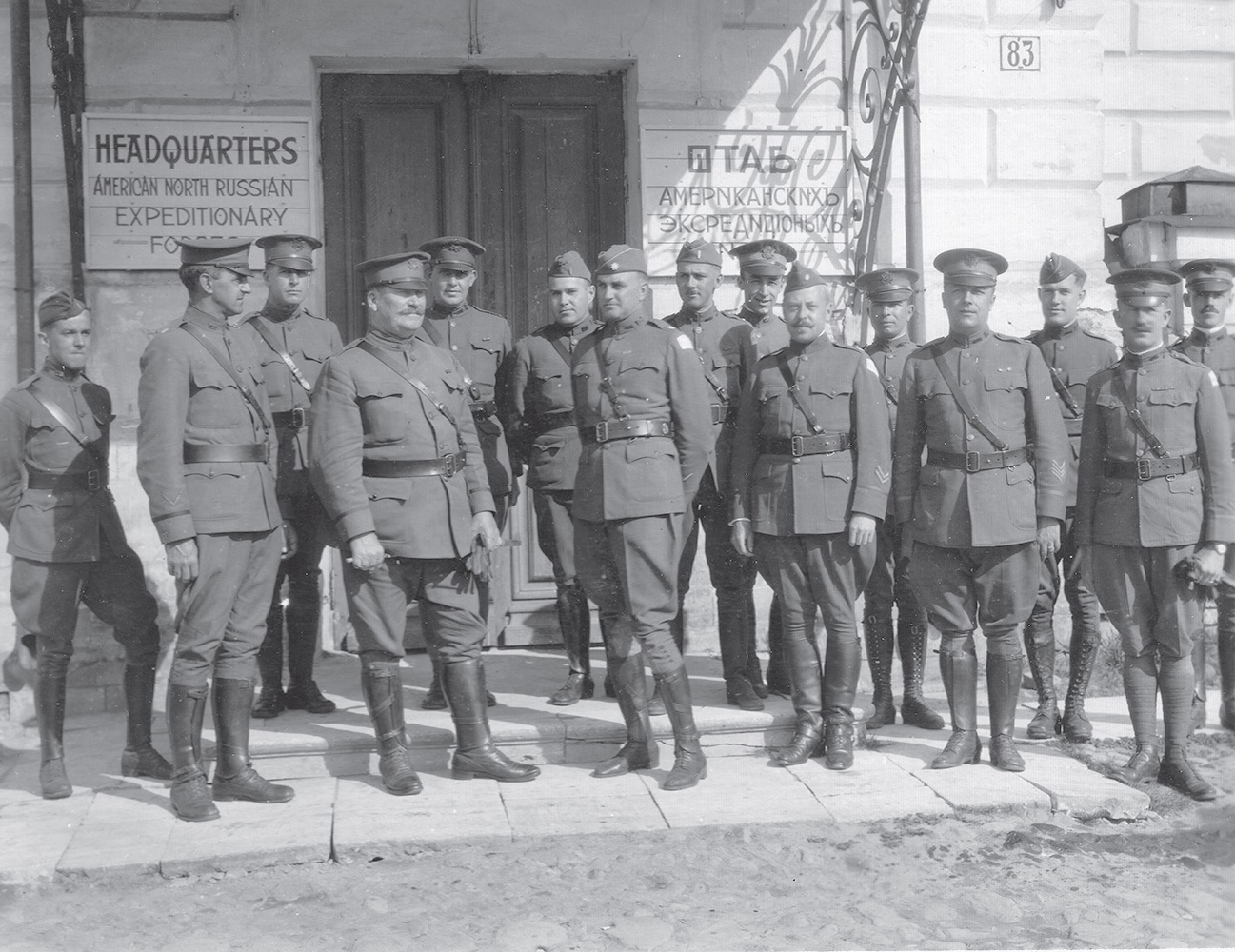
Richardson (fourth from left) and his staff at ANREF Headquarters in Arkhangelsk (1919)

After graduation in 1884, Richardson was commissioned as a second lieutenant in the 8th Cavalry Regiment, serving in California and other western posts. Richardson was promoted to first lieutenant in 1889, and joined the faculty at West Point three years later.

In 1897, Richardson was sent to Alaska to begin what would be a twenty-year stay. Initially in charge of scouting locations and supervising construction of military installations, in 1905 Richardson was appointed head of the War Department's Alaska Road Commission, which oversaw federal road construction projects in the territory. His major project was the completion of a 380-mile (610 km) road from Valdez to Fairbanks, later named the Richardson Highway in his honor.

After the entry of the United States into World War I, Richardson—promoted to brigadier general in August 1917—was assigned to command the 78th Infantry Brigade of the 39th Division at Camp Beauregard, Louisiana, in March 1918. Arriving at Brest, France, on 3 September 1918, Richardson's unit participated in the closing stages of the war. After the Armistice, General John J. Pershing assigned Richardson—because of his Alaskan cold-weather experience—to the Polar Bear Expedition in Murmansk in mid-March 1919. He arrived in Arkhangelsk on 17 April 1919 to take over command of the American North Russian Expeditionary Forces (ANREF) from Colonel George E. Stewart, who had arrived there in September 1918. Returning to the U.S. in October 1919, he was given command of the 5th Infantry Division until March 1920. Richardson then reverted to the rank of colonel and retired in October 1920.

== Awards ==
He received the Army Distinguished Service Medal which was awarded for his actions during the Russian Civil War. The citation reads:

The President of the United States of America, authorized by Act of Congress, July 9, 1918, takes pleasure in presenting the Army Distinguished Service Medal to Brigadier General Wilds Preston Richardson, United States Army, for exceptionally meritorious and distinguished services to the Government of the United States, in a duty of great responsibility during World War I. As Commanding General of the American Expeditionary Forces in North Russia, by his skillful handling of the many difficult situations which arose, General Richardson rendered a signal service to the United States Government.

== Retirement, death, and legacy ==
Richardson lived the remainder of his years at the Army and Navy Club in Washington, D.C.; he died at Walter Reed Hospital on 20 May 1929 and was buried at West Point. He was posthumously promoted to brigadier general by a June 1930 act of Congress.

The U.S. Army post established near Anchorage, Alaska, in 1940 was named Fort Richardson in his honor. The Valdez-Fairbanks Trail, surveyed under his supervision in 1904, was named the Richardson Trail to honor him. In World War II, the U.S. Navy transport ship General W. P. Richardson was named in his honor.
