= Big Delta, Alaska =

CDP in the United States

- CDP
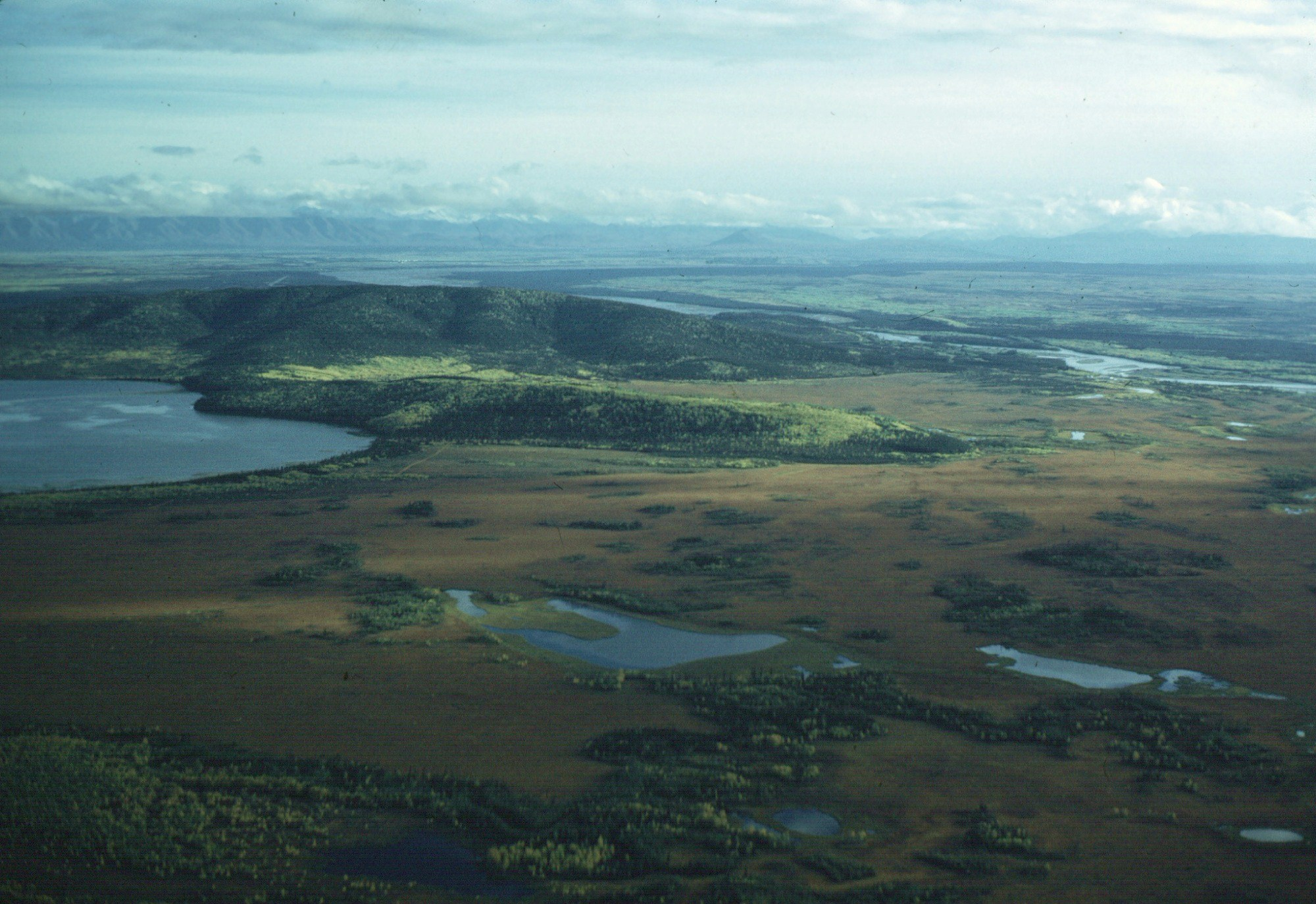
- Aerial view of Big Delta region

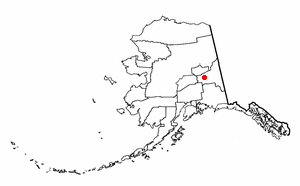
- Location of Big Delta, Alaska
- Coordinates: 64°8′50″N 145°48′6″W
- Country: United States
- State: Alaska
- Census Area: Southeast Fairbanks

Government
  - State senator: Click Bishop (R)
  - State rep.: Mike Cronk (R)

Area
  - Total: 53.84 sq mi (139.44 km^{2})
  - Land: 46.95 sq mi (121.59 km^{2})
  - Water: 6.90 sq mi (17.86 km^{2})
- Elevation: 994 ft (303 m)

Population (2020)
  - Total: 444
  - Density: 9.5/sq mi (3.65/km^{2})
- Time zone: UTC-9 (Alaska (AKST))
  - Summer (DST): UTC-8 (AKDT)
- ZIP code: 99737
- Area code: 907
- FIPS code: 02-06850
- GNIS feature ID: 1398949

Big Delta is a census-designated place (CDP) in Southeast Fairbanks Census Area, Alaska, United States. As of the 2020 census, Big Delta had a population of 444. Big Delta is at the confluence of the Delta River and the Tanana River and gets its name from the huge river delta formed by the confluence.

== History ==
From at least 10,000 years ago to the present, Athabascan Indians have inhabited portions of the interior of Alaska. They survived by hunting the abundant game and fishing in the rivers of the interior of Alaska.

Beginning in 1899, the United States Army built a pack trail from Valdez, on the south coast of Alaska, to Eagle, northeast of Big Delta, a distance of about 660 km (410 mi). The trail crossed the Tanana River near the confluence of the Delta and Tanana Rivers.

Gold was discovered in 1902 in Fairbanks, about 150 km (93 mi) north of the crossing of the Tanana River. Roadhouses were built along the pack trail that connected the south coast of Alaska with Fairbanks. One such roadhouse was Bates Landing, which was built at the confluence of the Delta and Tanana Rivers, about 12 km (7.5 mi) north of the current Delta Junction, in the area known now as Big Delta. The U. S. government collected a toll on the south side of the Tanana River from all passengers crossing north. In 1904 work began on the Richardson Highway, which mostly followed the route of the pack trail.

In 1906, John Hajdukovich bought the roadhouse and enlarged it. In addition to running the lodge there, he took hunting parties into the nearby Granite Mountains and traded with the Athabaskans in the surrounding area. An 18-year-old Swedish girl named Rika Wallen came to the roadhouse to work for John. After several years, John deeded the roadhouse to Rika in lieu of back wages he owed her. Rika also homesteaded an adjoining piece of land. Rika's Roadhouse and the adjacent property are now the Big Delta State Historical Park.

In 1928 a herd of bison were brought from the U. S. state of Montana to Big Delta, because they were thought to be threatened with extinction in the continental United States. The herd still roams in the Delta Junction area, about 12 km (7.5 mi) south of Big Delta.

The construction of the Alaska Highway during World War II shifted much of the economic activity of the area south to Delta Junction. Later history of the area can be found in the entry for Delta Junction.

== Geography ==
Big Delta is located at 64°8′50″N 145°48′6″W (64.147324, -145.801545).

According to the United States Census Bureau, the CDP has a total area of 61.1 square miles (158 km^{2}), of which, 55.2 square miles (143 km^{2}) of it is land and 5.9 square miles (15 km^{2}) of it (9.70%) is water.

== Climate ==
Big Delta has a dry-winter subarctic climate (Köppen Dwc) with short, mild summers and long, severely cold winters.

Climate data for Delta 6 N, Alaska, 1991–2020 normals, 1996–2024 extremes: 1059ft (323m)
| Month | Jan | Feb | Mar | Apr | May | Jun | Jul | Aug | Sep | Oct | Nov | Dec | Year |
|---|---|---|---|---|---|---|---|---|---|---|---|---|---|
| Record high °F (°C) | 45 (7) | 51 (11) | 55 (13) | 72 (22) | 84 (29) | 90 (32) | 88 (31) | 85 (29) | 71 (22) | 74 (23) | 50 (10) | 53 (12) | 90 (32) |
| Mean maximum °F (°C) | 32.6 (0.3) | 33.6 (0.9) | 42.3 (5.7) | 59.7 (15.4) | 74.0 (23.3) | 82.5 (28.1) | 83.3 (28.5) | 78.1 (25.6) | 66.7 (19.3) | 51.4 (10.8) | 33.2 (0.7) | 31.8 (−0.1) | 81.9 (27.7) |
| Mean daily maximum °F (°C) | 2.9 (−16.2) | 12.9 (−10.6) | 23.6 (−4.7) | 43.8 (6.6) | 59.5 (15.3) | 68.8 (20.4) | 70.0 (21.1) | 64.1 (17.8) | 52.8 (11.6) | 32.4 (0.2) | 12.1 (−11.1) | 5.5 (−14.7) | 37.4 (3.0) |
| Daily mean °F (°C) | −6.5 (−21.4) | 1.8 (−16.8) | 8.9 (−12.8) | 30.5 (−0.8) | 45.6 (7.6) | 55.7 (13.2) | 58.1 (14.5) | 52.3 (11.3) | 41.0 (5.0) | 23.0 (−5.0) | 3.4 (−15.9) | −3.3 (−19.6) | 25.9 (−3.4) |
| Mean daily minimum °F (°C) | −15.8 (−26.6) | −9.4 (−23.0) | −5.8 (−21.0) | 17.2 (−8.2) | 31.7 (−0.2) | 42.6 (5.9) | 46.1 (7.8) | 40.5 (4.7) | 29.1 (−1.6) | 13.6 (−10.2) | −5.3 (−20.7) | −12.1 (−24.5) | 14.4 (−9.8) |
| Mean minimum °F (°C) | −47.7 (−44.3) | −38.4 (−39.1) | −32.8 (−36.0) | −10.8 (−23.8) | 18.6 (−7.4) | 29.3 (−1.5) | 34.2 (1.2) | 26.6 (−3.0) | 14.4 (−9.8) | −6.6 (−21.4) | −30.6 (−34.8) | −40.8 (−40.4) | −51.7 (−46.5) |
| Record low °F (°C) | −65 (−54) | −60 (−51) | −50 (−46) | −35 (−37) | 8 (−13) | 17 (−8) | 28 (−2) | 22 (−6) | −3 (−19) | −38 (−39) | −48 (−44) | −56 (−49) | −65 (−54) |
| Average precipitation inches (mm) | 0.41 (10) | 0.33 (8.4) | 0.32 (8.1) | 0.28 (7.1) | 0.99 (25) | 2.35 (60) | 2.81 (71) | 2.12 (54) | 1.25 (32) | 0.72 (18) | 0.58 (15) | 0.46 (12) | 12.62 (320.6) |
| Average snowfall inches (cm) | 6.20 (15.7) | 4.70 (11.9) | 3.60 (9.1) | 2.50 (6.4) | 1.20 (3.0) | 0.00 (0.00) | 0.00 (0.00) | 0.00 (0.00) | 1.50 (3.8) | 7.40 (18.8) | 8.90 (22.6) | 6.80 (17.3) | 42.8 (108.6) |
Source 1: NOAA
Source 2: XMACIS2 (records & monthly max/mins)

Climate data for Big Delta
| Month | Jan | Feb | Mar | Apr | May | Jun | Jul | Aug | Sep | Oct | Nov | Dec | Year |
|---|---|---|---|---|---|---|---|---|---|---|---|---|---|
| Record high °F (°C) | 54 (12) | 51 (11) | 58 (14) | 72 (22) | 90 (32) | 92 (33) | 91 (33) | 90 (32) | 79 (26) | 74 (23) | 52 (11) | 55 (13) | 92 (33) |
| Mean daily maximum °F (°C) | 3.6 (−15.8) | 12.9 (−10.6) | 23.4 (−4.8) | 41.2 (5.1) | 57.1 (13.9) | 67.1 (19.5) | 69.3 (20.7) | 64.5 (18.1) | 52.7 (11.5) | 31.9 (−0.1) | 13.7 (−10.2) | 5.7 (−14.6) | 36.9 (2.7) |
| Mean daily minimum °F (°C) | −10.8 (−23.8) | −4.2 (−20.1) | 1.7 (−16.8) | 20.9 (−6.2) | 37.2 (2.9) | 47.5 (8.6) | 50.7 (10.4) | 45.8 (7.7) | 35.7 (2.1) | 18.6 (−7.4) | −0.1 (−17.8) | −8.5 (−22.5) | 19.5 (−6.9) |
| Record low °F (°C) | −63 (−53) | −60 (−51) | −49 (−45) | −37 (−38) | −1 (−18) | 26 (−3) | 32 (0) | 22 (−6) | −2 (−19) | −39 (−39) | −47 (−44) | −62 (−52) | −63 (−53) |
| Average precipitation inches (mm) | 0.31 (7.9) | 0.3 (7.6) | 0.23 (5.8) | 0.25 (6.4) | 0.89 (23) | 2.31 (59) | 2.62 (67) | 1.92 (49) | 1.05 (27) | 0.61 (15) | 0.45 (11) | 0.35 (8.9) | 11.3 (290) |
| Average snowfall inches (cm) | 5.6 (14) | 5.2 (13) | 4.3 (11) | 2.8 (7.1) | 0.6 (1.5) | 0 (0) | 0 (0) | 0 (0) | 1.6 (4.1) | 9.2 (23) | 8.5 (22) | 5.8 (15) | 43.8 (111) |
| Average precipitation days | 6 | 5 | 4 | 4 | 7 | 11 | 13 | 12 | 9 | 9 | 7 | 6 | 93 |

== Demographics ==
Historical population
| Census | Pop. | Note | %± |
|---|---|---|---|
| 1950 | 155 | | — |
| 1980 | 285 | | — |
| 1990 | 400 | | 40.4% |
| 2000 | 749 | | 87.3% |
| 2010 | 591 | | −21.1% |
| 2020 | 444 | | −24.9% |
U.S. Decennial Census

Big Delta first appeared on the 1950 U.S. Census as an unincorporated village. It did not appear again until 1980 when it was made a census-designated place (CDP).

As of the census of 2000, there were 749 people, 165 households, and 117 families residing in the CDP. The population density was 13.6 inhabitants per square mile (5.3/km^{2}). There were 232 housing units at an average density of 4.2 per square mile (1.6/km^{2}). The racial makeup of the CDP was 95.46% White, 0.13% Black or African American, 1.47% Native American, 0.53% Asian, and 2.40% from two or more races. 2.54% of the population were Hispanic or Latino of any race.

There were 165 households, out of which 39.4% had children under the age of 18 living with them, 61.2% were married couples living together, 6.7% had a female householder with no husband present, and 28.5% were non-families. 21.8% of all households were made up of individuals, and 7.3% had someone living alone who was 65 years of age or older. The average household size was 3.18 and the average family size was 3.90.

In the CDP, the population was spread out, with 36.3% under the age of 18, 10.1% from 18 to 24, 23.5% from 25 to 44, 24.0% from 45 to 64, and 6.0% who were 65 years of age or older. The median age was 29 years. For every 100 females, there were 92.5 males. For every 100 females age 18 and over, there were 96.3 males.

The median income for a household in the CDP was $49,000, and the median income for a family was $53,125. Males had a median income of $32,250 versus $37,708 for females. The per capita income for the CDP was $14,803. About 7.9% of families and 30.0% of the population were below the poverty line, including 18.9% of those under age 18 and 16.0% of those age 65 or over.
