= Chicken, Alaska =

Census-designated place in Alaska, US

Chicken
- CDP
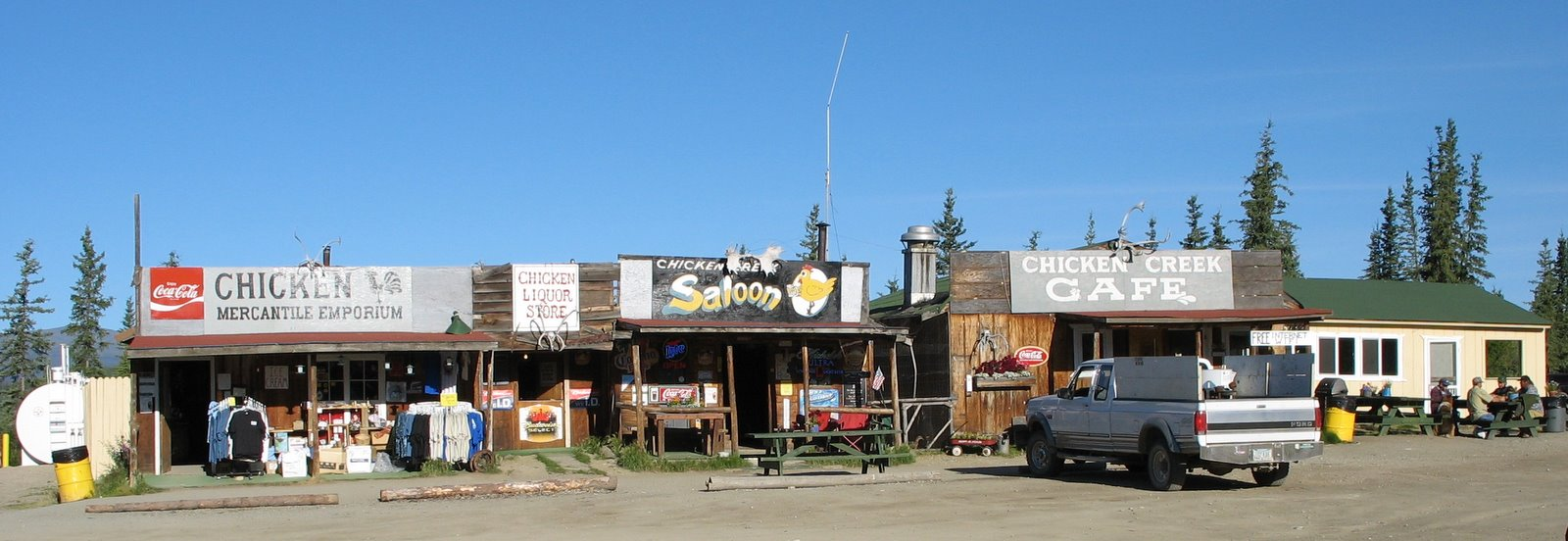
- Downtown Chicken in 2006

- Location within Alaska Location within North America Location within Earth
- Coordinates: 64°04′24″N 141°56′10″W
- Country: United States
- State: Alaska
- Census Area: Southeast Fairbanks

Government
  - State senator: Mike Cronk (R)
  - State rep.: Rebecca Schwanke (R)

Area
  - Total: 115.95 sq mi (300.32 km^{2})
  - Land: 115.95 sq mi (300.32 km^{2})
  - Water: 0 sq mi (0.00 km^{2})
- Elevation: 1,677 ft (511 m)

Population (2020)
  - Total: 12
  - Density: 0.10/sq mi (0.04/km^{2})
- Time zone: UTC-9 (Alaska (AKST))
  - Summer (DST): UTC-8 (AKDT)
- ZIP code: 99732
- Area code: 907
- FIPS code: 02-13450
- GNIS feature ID: 1400245

Chicken is a census-designated place in Southeast Fairbanks Census Area, Alaska. It is a community founded on gold mining, and is one of the few surviving gold rush towns in Alaska. The population was 12 at the time of the 2020 census, up from 7 in 2010. Due to mining, Chicken's population peaks during the summer.

== History ==
Chicken was settled by gold miners in the late-19th century. In 1902 the local post office was established, requiring a community name. Legendarily, due to the prevalence of ptarmigan in the area, that name was suggested as the official name for the new community. However, the spelling could not be agreed on, and "Chicken" was used to avoid embarrassment. However, this is likely apocryphal, since it was popularized in the 1940s, almost 50 years after the town was founded. The most likely origin is from nearby Chicken Creek, as noted by Josiah Edward Spurr in 1896, “The creek is so named from the size of the gold, which is about that of chicken feed (corn).” Chicken has frequently been noted on lists of unusual place names.

A portion of Chicken, with buildings from the early 1900s and the F.E. Company Dredge No. 4 (Pedro Dredge), is listed on the National Register of Historic Places as the Chicken Historic District. Chicken is the outpost for the 40-Mile mining district. There are still active gold mines and inactive gold dredges in this area. Enough gold was mined here to make it worthwhile to haul huge gold dredges to this remote location.

On September 7, 2021, Jack in the Box released an ad campaign claiming to have purchased the town for 10,000 Cluck Chicken Sandwiches and a commemorative hat. The company explains on a website created for the campaign this was only an ad, but that the company has donated $10,000 to help the town amid the pandemic. However, as of September 2021 the downtown area of Chicken (not owned by Jack in the Box) was for sale, including the Chicken Creek Cafe, the Chicken Creek Saloon, a liquor store, a gas station, the Chicken Mercantile Emporium, and a 1400-sq.-ft. residential cabin.

== Geography ==
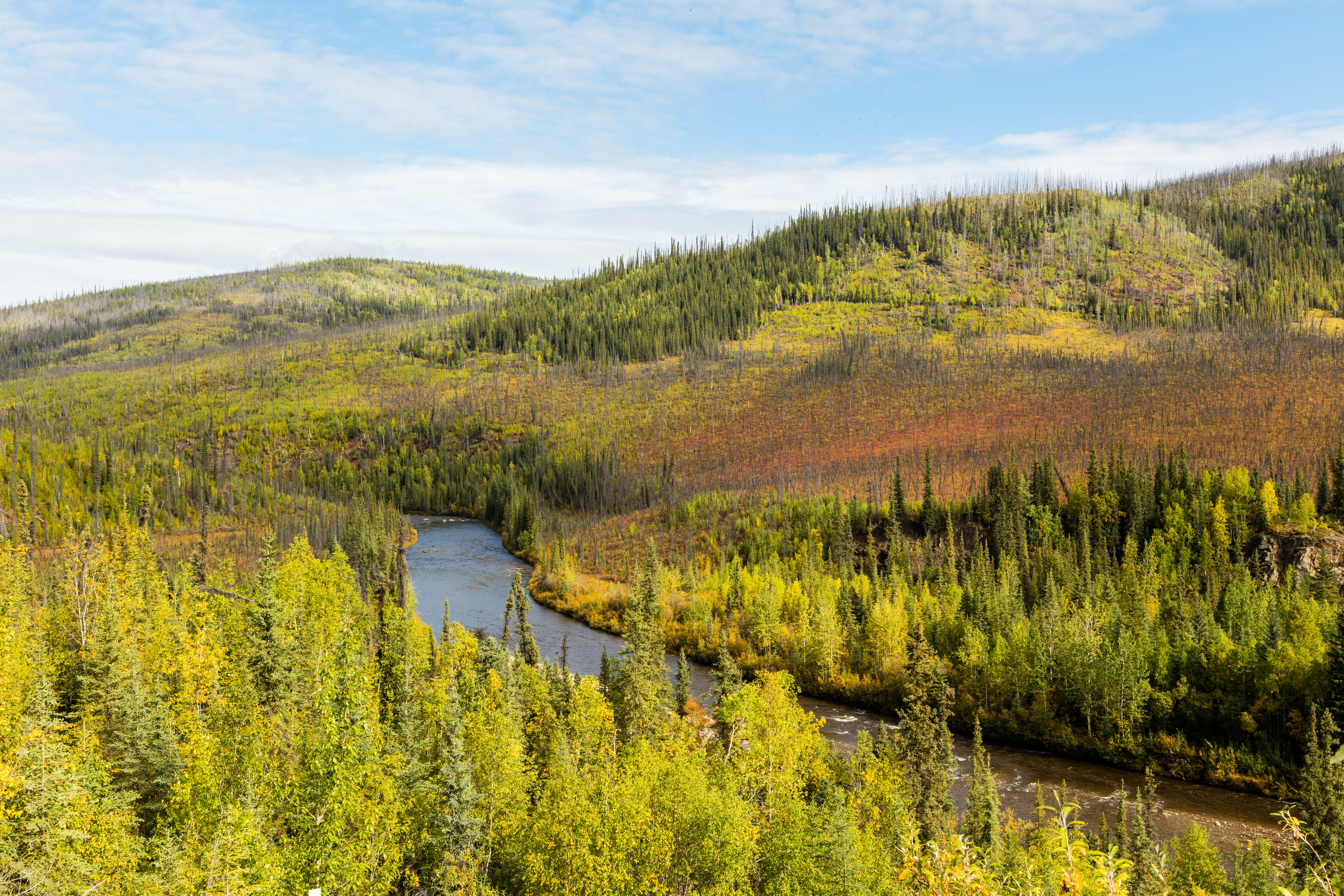
South Fork River in Chicken

According to the United States Census Bureau, the CDP has a total area of 115.4 square miles (299 km^{2}), all of it land.

Chicken is accessible by air via Chicken Airport, and by road via Alaska Route 5, the Taylor Highway, which is not maintained from mid-October through mid-March.

=== Climate ===
According to the Köppen Climate Classification system, Chicken has a dry-winter subarctic climate (Koppen: Dwc), it is characterized by extremely cold and long winters and warm, short summers. The average temperature of Chicken is 20.2 °F (−6.6 °C), July is the hottest month with 56.1 °F (13.4 °C), and the coldest month is January with −20.0 °F (−28.9 °C). Although Chicken has a latitude of 64°N, it is hardly affected by the Chinook winds. So far, the maximum temperature in January has never exceeded 32 °F (0 °C), and the extreme high temperature in December is also 32 °F (0 °C). Even in the hottest months, nighttime temperatures are low enough that there is a greater chance of frost in the hottest months of the year, June and July. Extreme temperatures range from −72 °F (−58 °C) to 91 °F (33 °C). Among them, four days of extreme low temperature were recorded, namely January 1, 2000, February 7–8, 2008, and December 31, 1999. Chicken holds the United States record for the coldest temperature ever recorded in the country in December. Chicken's extreme high temperature was recorded for two days; both occurred on July 4 and 7, 1998. The record cold daily maximum is −64 °F (−53 °C), set on January 1, 2000, while, conversely, the record warm daily minimum is 61 °F (16 °C) on June 9, 2017. The coldest day of the year averaged −49 °F (−45 °C) in the 1991 to 2020 normals, while the warmest night average was at 53 °F (12 °C).

Climate data for Chicken, Alaska, 1991–2020, extremes 1953–present
Month	Jan	Feb	Mar	Apr	May	Jun	Jul	Aug	Sep	Oct	Nov	Dec	Year
Record high °F (°C)	31 (−1)	43 (6)	54 (12)	75 (24)	84 (29)	90 (32)	91 (33)	87 (31)	72 (22)	64 (18)	35 (2)	32 (0)	91 (33)
Mean maximum °F (°C)	15.2 (−9.3)	24.1 (−4.4)	41.7 (5.4)	57.8 (14.3)	74.5 (23.6)	81.8 (27.7)	82.4 (28.0)	79.0 (26.1)	66.1 (18.9)	49.2 (9.6)	23.7 (−4.6)	18.9 (−7.3)	84.3 (29.1)
Mean daily maximum °F (°C)	−11.4 (−24.1)	0.6 (−17.4)	20.3 (−6.5)	42.4 (5.8)	58.2 (14.6)	68.5 (20.3)	70.2 (21.2)	64.3 (17.9)	52.7 (11.5)	30.5 (−0.8)	3.5 (−15.8)	−7.0 (−21.7)	32.7 (0.4)
Daily mean °F (°C)	−20.0 (−28.9)	−10.6 (−23.7)	3.4 (−15.9)	27.1 (−2.7)	43.8 (6.6)	53.3 (11.8)	56.1 (13.4)	50.3 (10.2)	39.3 (4.1)	20.0 (−6.7)	−5.3 (−20.7)	−14.9 (−26.1)	20.2 (−6.6)
Mean daily minimum °F (°C)	−28.6 (−33.7)	−21.9 (−29.9)	−13.6 (−25.3)	11.7 (−11.3)	29.3 (−1.5)	38.2 (3.4)	42.0 (5.6)	36.3 (2.4)	25.9 (−3.4)	9.5 (−12.5)	−14.2 (−25.7)	−22.9 (−30.5)	7.6 (−13.6)
Mean minimum °F (°C)	−58.7 (−50.4)	−47.7 (−44.3)	−37.4 (−38.6)	−12.4 (−24.7)	16.3 (−8.7)	27.1 (−2.7)	31.3 (−0.4)	23.7 (−4.6)	10.9 (−11.7)	−12.5 (−24.7)	−36.9 (−38.3)	−47.3 (−44.1)	−61.2 (−51.8)
Record low °F (°C)	−72 (−58)	−72 (−58)	−58 (−50)	−32 (−36)	5 (−15)	15 (−9)	24 (−4)	19 (−7)	−7 (−22)	−39 (−39)	−52 (−47)	−72 (−58)	−72 (−58)
Average precipitation inches (mm)	0.36 (9.1)	0.25 (6.4)	0.25 (6.4)	0.30 (7.6)	1.04 (26)	2.40 (61)	2.84 (72)	2.01 (51)	1.10 (28)	0.64 (16)	0.59 (15)	0.49 (12)	12.27 (312)
Average snowfall inches (cm)	5.7 (14)	2.6 (6.6)	2.7 (6.9)	2.3 (5.8)	1.0 (2.5)	0.0 (0.0)	0.0 (0.0)	0.0 (0.0)	1.1 (2.8)	6.1 (15)	7.9 (20)	7.2 (18)	36.6 (93)
Average precipitation days (≥ 0.01 in)	3.4	2.0	1.5	1.8	5.0	8.4	10.9	9.7	6.1	4.1	4.2	3.8	60.9
Average snowy days (≥ 0.1 in)	4.1	2.3	1.9	1.5	0.5	0.0	0.0	0.0	1.1	4.3	5.0	4.4	25.1
Source 1: NOAA
Source 2: WRCC

== Demographics ==
Historical population
Census	Pop.	Note	%±
1930	20		—
1940	41		105.0%
1950	34		−17.1%
1980	37		—
2000	17		—
2010	7		−58.8%
2020	12		71.4%
U.S. Decennial Census

Of the 12 residents recorded in the 2020 Census, one was listed as Hispanic or Latino. During the summer, the town receives visitors from outside, causing the population to rise slightly.

== Traditions ==
Every June, the town hosts Chickenstock, an annual bluegrass and folk music festival. The event features live performances from regional bands on a stage built out of vintage trucks and draws hundreds of travelers and campers to the area. This annual gathering temporarily spikes the population of the remote, off-grid community during the peak of the Alaskan summer.
