= Granite Mountains (Alaska) =

Mountain range of Alaska, US

- Granite Mountain

Highest point
- Elevation: 1,485 m (4,872 ft)
- Coordinates: 63°46′50″N 145°23′59″W

The Granite Mountains, also called Granite Mountain, is a small mountain range in the Southeast Fairbanks Census Area of the U.S. state of Alaska. The Granite Mountains are southeast of Delta Junction, the nearest city. This mountain range is part of the larger Alaska Range.

== Geology ==
The bulk of the Granite Mountains is composed of light gray, medium to coarse-grained granodiorite and quartz monzonite. They are composed of plagioclase potassium feldspar, quartz, biotite, hornblende, and accessory minerals. The plagioclase is euhedral to subhedral; the potash feldspar is anhedral; and some of the quartz is anhedral, but most is interstitial. The Plagioclase exhibits polysynthetically twins and zonation and the potassium feldspar displays Carlsbad twinning. Biotite and green hornblende occur as inclusions in the feldspars and as independent grains. In the western part of the Granite Mountains, the granodiorite and quartz monzonite are deeply weathered. Further west, they are in intrusive contact with the older Birch Creek Schist. The southerneast quarter of the Granite Mountains is underlain by quartz, mica schist. It can be inferred from regional studies that these granodiorite and quartz monzonite were intruded into older metamorphic rocks during Cretaceous time and contemporaneously with the deformation of the Alaska Range.

A surface layer of rubble composed of angular granitic rock fragments covers the bedrock underlying the gently rolling summits of the Granite Mountains. This rubble is derived from underlying bedrock. In places, the granitic fragments are encased in a sandy or silty matrix. The surface rubble exhibits especially well developed frost features. They include segregated and unsegregated stripes, stone polygons, and nets, vegetation rings, earth hummocks, and tussocks. Only a few knobs of deeply weathered granitic bedrock rise above the surroundung rubble. Patches of grus surrounded these bedrock knobs. Unaffected by glacial and fluvial processes, the rubble and grus formed by the action of weathering and periglacial processes operating on the local bedrock after the early Wisconsin Stage to present.

The Granite Mountains contains only six cirques, which represent one, likely early Wisconsin advance. They lie between elevations of 580 to 700 m (1,900 to 2,300 ft) above sea level. The associated glacial deposits only extended about 10 km (6.2 mi) down northeast and northwest trending valleys and 4.5 to 6 km (2.8 to 3.7 mi) down southwest-trending valleys. The polymodal distribution of cirques on the Granite Mountains indicates that aspect was not critical at that time to the formation of glaciers. There is a lack of evidence for either Holocene or late Wisconsin glaciations on the Granite Mountain possibly because of restricted catchment areas that limited the accumulation of snow.

On the northeast flank of the Granite Mountains and west of the Gerstle River lie three ridges composed of steeply tilted beds of moderately consolidated pebble, cobble, and boulder conglomerate. Some of the beds contain boulders as large as 2 m (6.6 ft) in diameter and boulders of lithologies not found in modern drainage basins adjacent to the ridges. These beds are suspected of being Pre-Quaternary glacial deposits.

Finally, in the vicinity of Arrow Creek, small, isolated patches of old, partly consolidated gravel occur on the slopes of the northernmost promontory of the Granite Mountains. These gravel deposits are not regarded to be glacial deposits. Instead, they are thought to be erosional remnants of once more more extensive gravel beds of the Neogene Nenana Gravel were deposited on and once partially buried the slopes of the Granite Mountains.
