= Taylor Highway =

State highway in Alaska, United States

Taylor Highway
- Taylor Highway highlighted in red

Route information
- Maintained by Alaska DOT&PF
- Length: 160 mi (260 km)
- Existed: 1953–present

Major junctions
- South end: AK-2 (Alaska Highway) at Tetlin Junction
- Top of the World Highway at Jack Wade Junction
- North end: Front Street in Eagle

Location
- Country: United States
- State: Alaska
- Boroughs: Unorganized

Highway system
- Alaska Routes; Interstate; Scenic Byways
← AK-4	→ AK-6

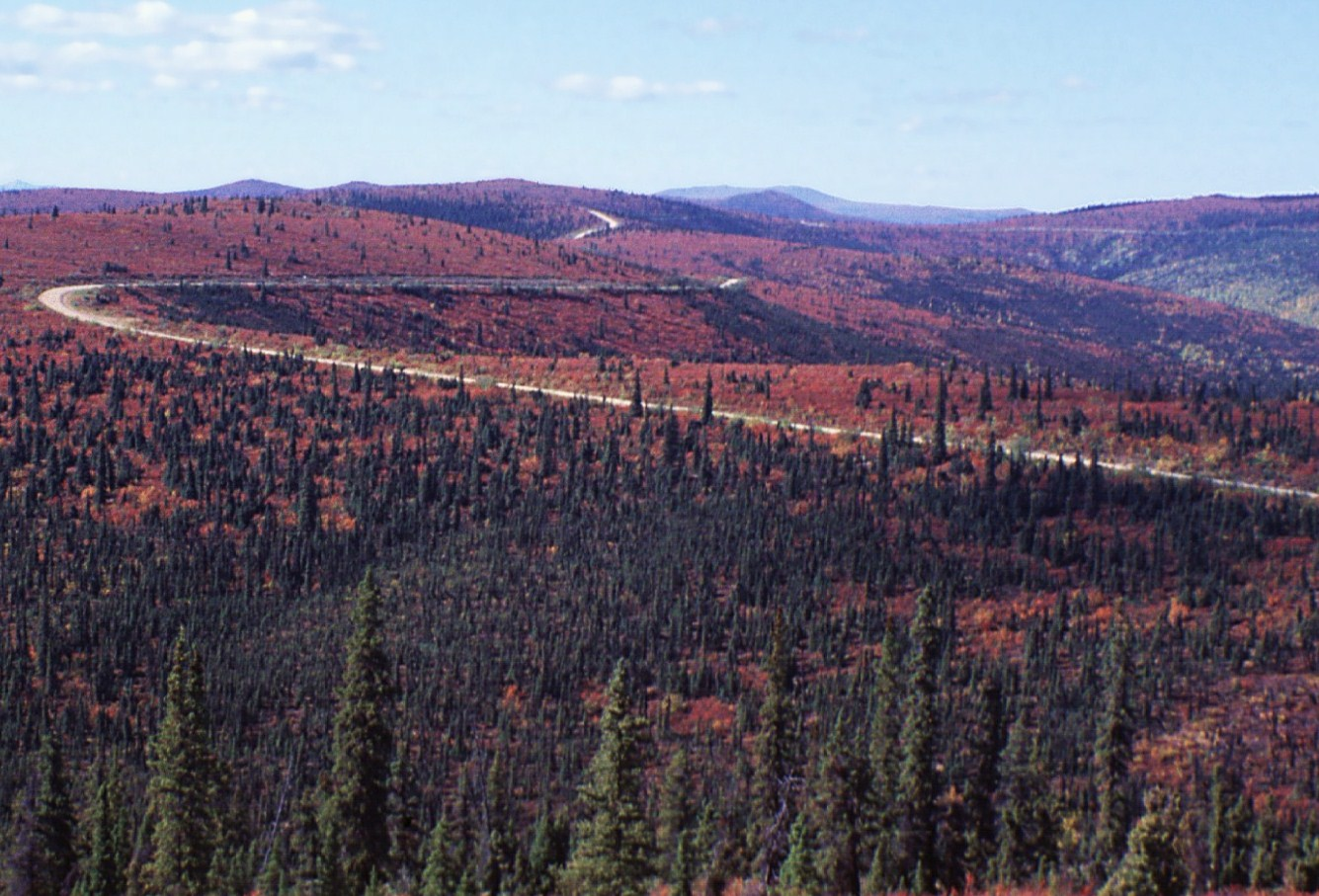
Fall colors along Taylor Highway

The Taylor Highway (numbered Alaska Route 5) is a highway in the U.S. state of Alaska that extends 160 miles (258 km) from Tetlin Junction, about 11 miles (17 km) east of Tok on the Alaska Highway, to Eagle. The southern 96 miles from the Alaska Highway to Jack Wade Junction is designated as Alaska Route 5. The entire highway formerly carried this designation, but the north end of Route 5 has been rerouted to follow the Top of the World Highway to the Canadian border.

== Route description ==
The first 60 miles (97 km) of the highway is paved; the rest is gravel. The highway is closed to automobile traffic from October through April, but is used by snowmobiles in the winter. The large Fortymile caribou herd roams near the highway. The highway also provides access to the Fortymile River National Wild and Scenic River system.

== History ==
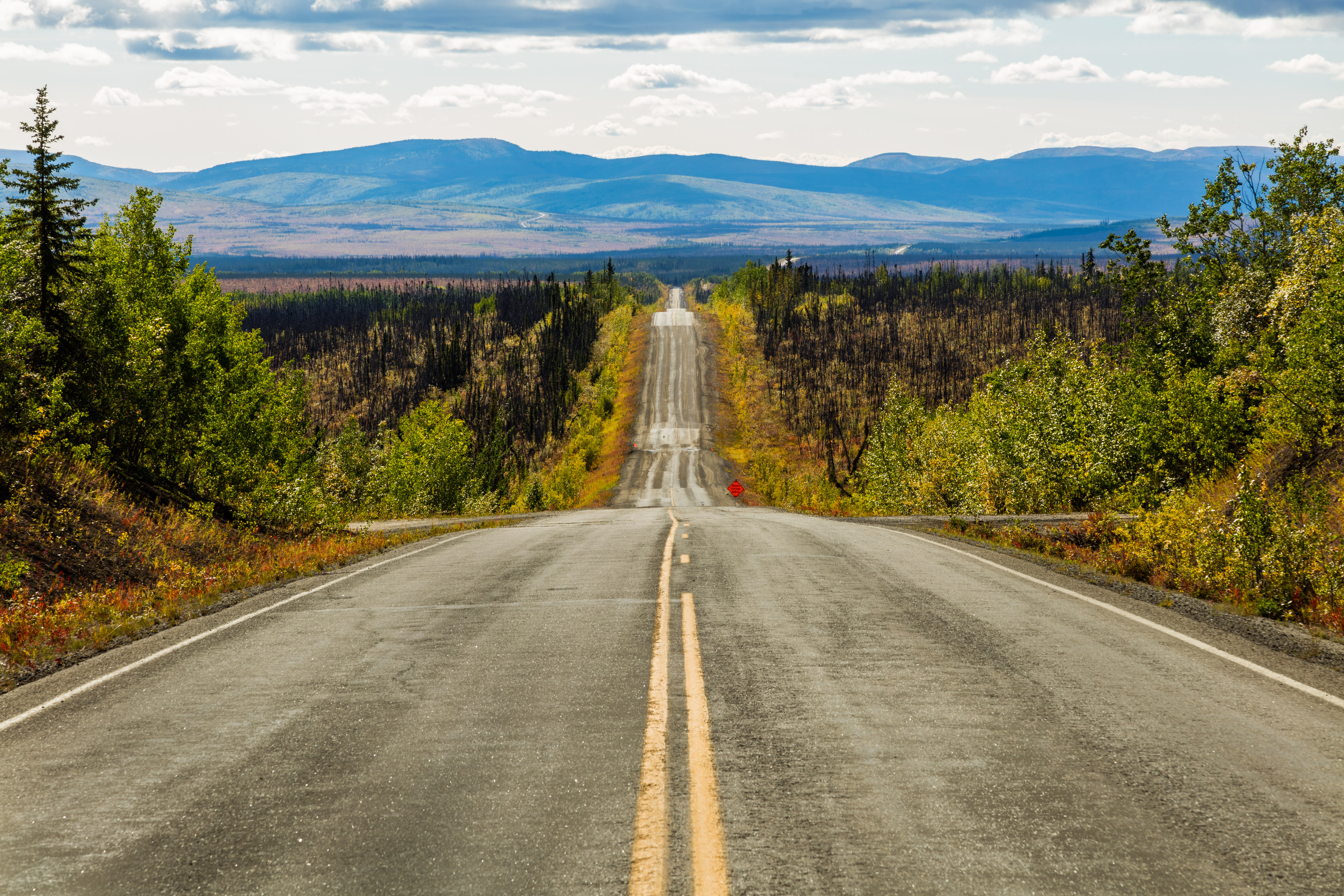

Wagon trails had supplied Eagle, Chicken, and the historic Fortymile Mining District since the nineteenth century. The Fortymile Road was established in 1951 and later renamed in honor of ARC President (1932–1948) Ike P. Taylor. It connects to the Top of the World Highway 96 miles (154 km) from Tetlin, at Jack Wade Junction, allowing road access to Dawson City, Yukon during parts of the year. It is 79 miles (127 km) from Jack Wade Junction to Dawson City.

== Major intersections ==
The entire route is in Unorganized Borough.

Location	mi	km	Destinations	Notes
Tetlin Junction	0	0.0	AK-2 (Alaska Highway) – Tok, Canada	Southern terminus of Alaska Route 5 & Taylor Highway
Chicken	66	106	Airport Road	To Chicken Airport
Jack Wade Junction	96	154	AK-5 (Top of the World Highway North) – Dawson City	Western terminus of Top of the World Highway
Eagle	160	260	Front Street	
1.000 mi = 1.609 km; 1.000 km = 0.621 mi

== See also ==
- List of Alaska Routes
