= List of ship launches in 1999 =

The list of ship launches in 1999 includes a chronological list of all ships launched in 1999.

Date	Ship	Class / type	Builder	Location	Country	Notes
10 January	Roosevelt	Arleigh Burke-class destroyer	Ingalls Shipbuilding	Pascagoula, Mississippi	United States	
29 January	Svend Mærsk	S-class container ship	Odense Staalskibsvaerft	Lindø	Denmark	For Maersk Line
7 February	Atlantic Voyager	VW 2500-type container ship	Volkswerft Stralsund	Stralsund	Germany	
13 February	Saudi Jeddah	London Express-class container ship	Samsung Shipbuilding & Heavy Industries	Koje	South Korea	For National Shipping Company of Saudi Arabia
27 February	Pluto	Stocznia Gdynia 8138-type container ship	Stocznia Gdynia	Gdynia	Poland	For Alpha Ship
3 March	Guépratte	La Fayette-class frigate			France	
3 April	Toisa Crest	Offshore supply vessel	Appledore Shipbuilders Ltd.	Appledore	United Kingdom	For Toisa Ltd.
10 April	Saudi Jubail	London Express-class container ship	Samsung Shipbuilding & Heavy Industries	Koje	South Korea	For National Shipping Company of Saudi Arabia
17 April	Stuart	Anzac-class frigate	Tenix Defence	Williamstown, Victoria	Australia	
17 April	Winston S. Churchill	Arleigh Burke-class destroyer	Bath Iron Works	Bath, Maine	United States	
23 April	Soroe Maersk	S-Class container ship	Odense Steel Shipyard	Odense, Denmark	Denmark	For Maersk Line
30 April	Berlin	Berlin-class replenishment ship	Flensburger Schiffbau-Gesellschaft	Flensburg	Germany	For German Navy
30 April	Poseidon	Stocznia Gdynia 8138-type container ship	Stocznia Gdynia	Gdynia	Poland	For Alpha Ship
1 May	Sheean	Collins-class submarine	Australian Submarine Corporation	Osborne, South Australia	Australia	
3 May	Pacific Voyager	VW 2500-type container ship	Volkswerft Stralsund	Stralsund	Germany	
15 May	Portland	Type 23 frigate	Yarrow Shipbuilders	Glasgow	United Kingdom	
15 May	Northern Merchant	RoRo-Ferry	Astilleros Espanoles SA		Spain	For Cenargo International Ltd.
25 May	Mendonca	Bob Hope-class vehicle cargo ship	Northrop Grumman Ship Systems	Avondale, Louisiana	United States	
May	Zeus	Container, general & bulk carrier	Tulcea shipyard	Tulcea	Romania	For Kg CDL Leasing GmbH & Co#
6 June	Rosenort	Type Fassmer BL 20	Fassmer	Berne	Germany	For Federal Ministry of Transport and Digital Infrastructure
11 June	Oie	Type Fassmer BL 20	Fassmer	Berne	Germany	For Federal Ministry of Transport and Digital Infrastructure
24 June	Ikazuchi	Murasame-class destroyer			Japan	
9 July	Maersk Mendoza	VW 2500-type container ship	Volkswerft Stralsund	Stralsund	Germany	
14 July	Olympic Voyager	Voyager-class cruise ship	Blohm + Voss	Hamburg	Germany	For Royal Olympic Cruises
28 July	Skagen Mærsk	S-class container ship	Odense Staalskibsvaerft	Lindø	Denmark	For Maersk Line
7 August	Red Cloud	Watson-class vehicle cargo ship	National Steel and Shipbuilding Company	San Diego, California	United States	
12 August	Róisín	Róisín-class patrol vessel	Appledore Shipbuilders Ltd.	Appledore	United Kingdom	For Irish Naval Service.
28 August	Spiegelgracht	Cargo ship	Tsuneishi Shipbuilding Company		Japan	For Spliethoff's Bevrachtingskantoor
August	R Three	Cruise ship	Chantiers de l'Atlantique	Saint-Nazaire	France	For Renaissance Cruises
17 September	Ta'Pinu	Ferry	Malta Drydocks	Valletta	Malta	For Gozo Channel Line
23 September	Glomar C.R. Luigs	Drillship	Harland & Wolff	Belfast	United Kingdom	For Glomar Marine Ltd.
27 September	Makishio	Oyashio-class submarine			Japan	
1 October	Seeadler	Seeadler-class fishery protection vessel	Peene-Werft	Wolgast	Germany	For German Federal Coast Guard
1 October	Saudi Yanbu	London Express-class container ship	Samsung Shipbuilding & Heavy Industries	Koje	South Korea	For National Shipping Company of Saudi Arabia
2 October	E.R. Hong Kong	Samsung 5500-class container ship	Samsung Heavy Industries	Goeje	South Korea	
8 October	Clifford Mærsk	S-class container ship	Odense Staalskibsvaerft	Lindø	Denmark	For Maersk Line
16 October	Lassen	Arleigh Burke-class destroyer	Ingalls Shipbuilding	Pascagoula, Mississippi	United States	
3 November	Weserwolf	Type Stocznia Gdynia 8184-container ship	Stocznia Gdynia	Gdynia	Poland	
4 November	Heike	Type Stocznia Gdynia 8184-container ship	Stocznia Gdynia	Gdynia	Poland	
4 November	Explorer of the Seas	Voyager-class cruise ship	Kvaerner Masa-Yards Turku New Shipyard	Turku	Finland	For Royal Caribbean International
7 November	Millennium	Millennium-class cruise ship	Chantiers de l'Atlantique	St. Nazaire	France	For Celebrity Cruises
7 November	E.R. Shanghai	Samsung 5500-class container ship	Samsung Heavy Industries	Goeje	South Korea	
11 November	Costa Atlantica	Spirit-class cruise ship	Kvaerner Masa-Yards Helsinki New Shipyard	Helsinki	Finland	For Costa Cruises
20 November	Howard	Arleigh Burke-class destroyer	Bath Iron Works	Bath, Maine	United States	
8 December	Grietje	Sietas type 161	J.J. Sietas	Hamburg-Neuenfelde	Germany	For SAL Heavy Lift
11 December	Charlton	Watson-class vehicle cargo ship	National Steel and Shipbuilding Company	San Diego, California	United States	
21 December	Stena Britannica	Seapacer-class RoPax-ferry	Astilleros Españoles	Puerto Real	Spain	For Stena Line
Date unknown	Atlas	Tugboat		Uzmar, Turkey	Turkey	Original name MT Yenikale
Date unknown	Maid of Poole	Passenger launch	David Abels Boatbuilders Ltd.	Bristol	United Kingdom	For Brownsea Island Ferries Ltd.
Date unknown	PAD 42 - 51	Launch	David Abels Boatbuilders Ltd.	Bristol	United Kingdom	For Nigeria Police Force.
Date unknown	Tan'erliq	Oceangoing tugboat	Dakota Creek Industries	Anacortes, Washington	United States	For Crowley Maritime
