= Meteorite Mountain =

Glaciated mountain summit in Alaska, USA

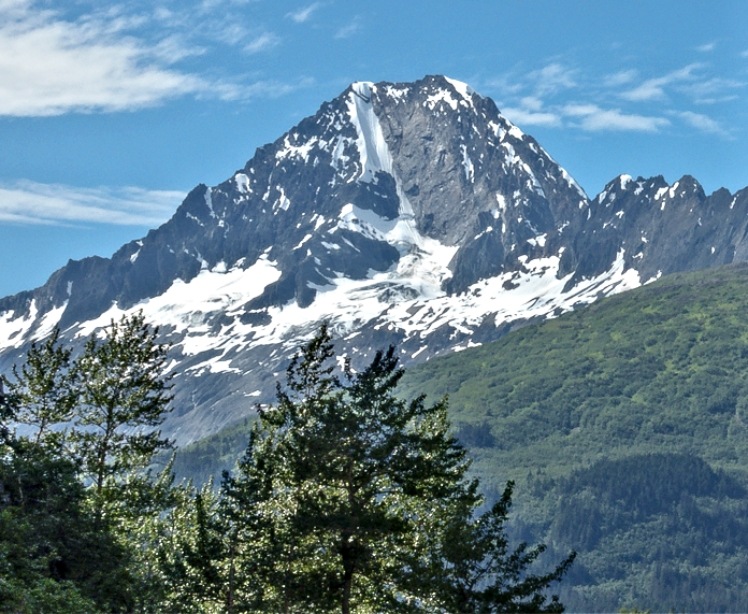
- Meteorite Mountain, north aspect

Highest point
- Elevation: 6,565 ft (2,001 m)
- Prominence: 2,965 ft (904 m)
- Parent peak: Mount Benet
- Isolation: 8.9 mi (14.3 km)
- Coordinates: 60°58′47″N 145°58′00″W

Geography
- Location within Alaska
- Interactive map of
- Location: Chugach Census Area; Alaska, United States
- Parent range: Chugach Mountains
- Topo map: USGS Cordova D-6

Meteorite Mountain is a prominent 6,565-foot (2,001 m) glaciated mountain summit located in the Chugach Mountains, in the U.S. state of Alaska. It is situated 16 mi (26 km) southeast of Valdez, 9 mi (14 km) south of Hogback Ridge, and 9 mi (14 km) southeast of Mount Francis. In January 1927, a meteorite hit this mountain, which is how the mountain got its name. The mountain's name was in local use when it was first published in 1953 by U.S. Geological Survey. Precipitation runoff and meltwater from the mountain's glaciers drains into tributaries of the Lowe River, which in turn empties to Prince William Sound.

== Climate ==
Based on the Köppen climate classification, Meteorite Mountain is located in a subarctic climate zone with long, cold, snowy winters, and cool summers. Weather systems coming off the Gulf of Alaska are forced upwards by the Chugach Mountains (orographic lift), causing heavy precipitation in the form of rainfall and snowfall. Temperatures can drop below −20 °C with wind chill factors below −30 °C. The months May through June offer the most favorable weather for viewing and climbing.

== Gallery ==
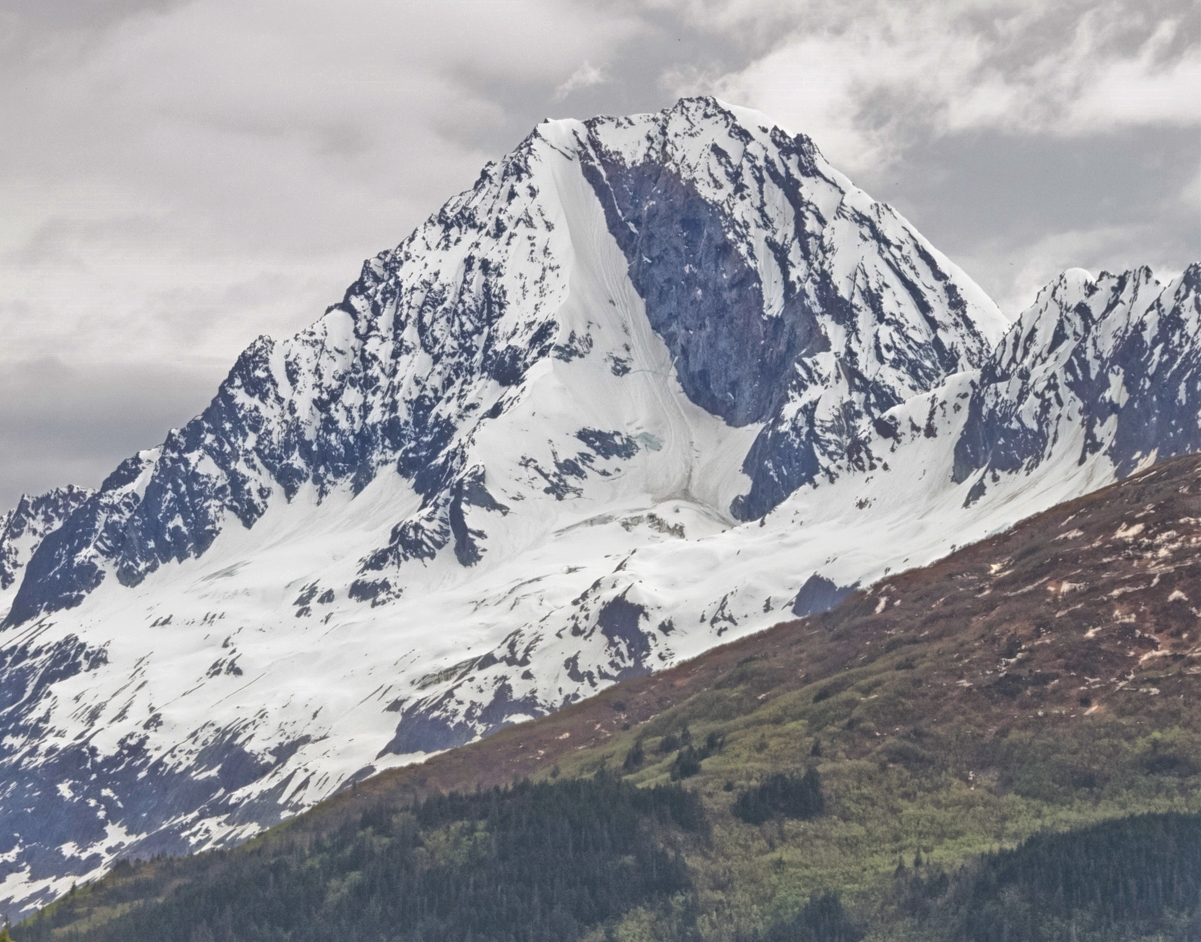

== See also ==
- List of mountain peaks of Alaska
- Geography of Alaska
