= East Peak (Alaska) =

Mountain in Alaska, United States

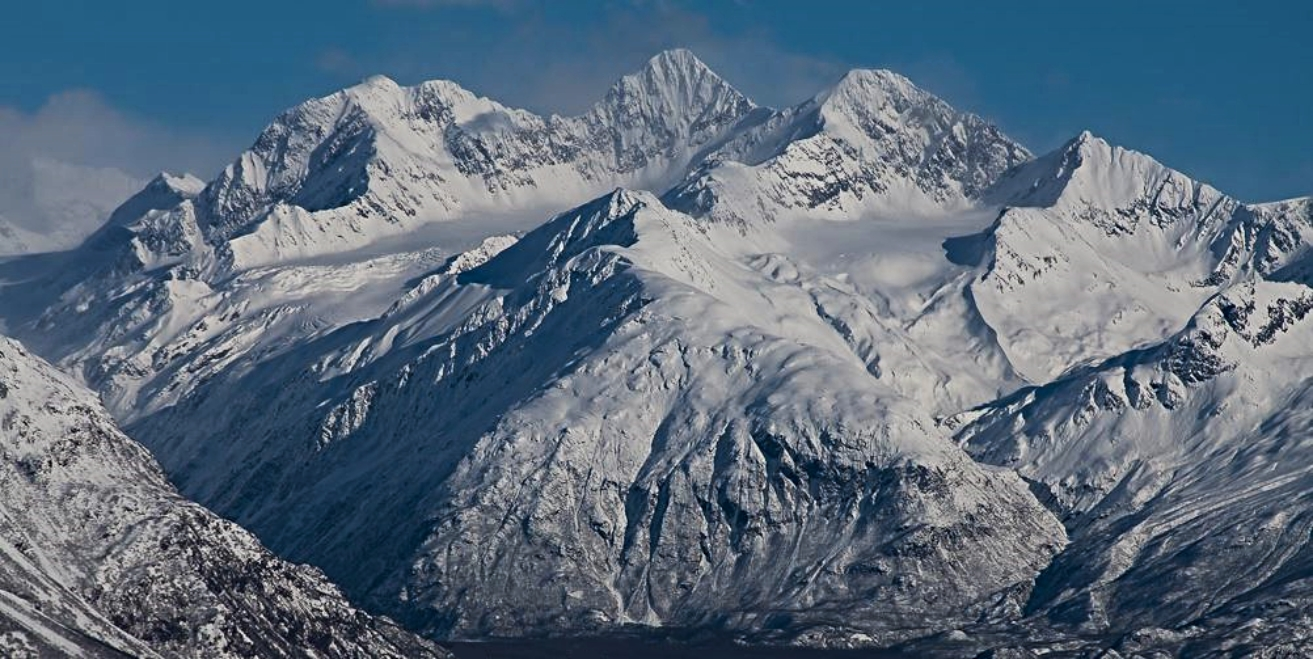
- East Peak and Mt. Benet from the west

Highest point
- Elevation: 6,650 ft (2,030 m)
- Prominence: 500 ft (150 m)
- Parent peak: Peak 7193 (Mount Benet)
- Isolation: 1.14 mi (1.83 km)
- Coordinates: 61°08′57″N 146°02′24″W

Geography
- Location within Alaska
- Interactive map of East Peak
- Location: Chugach Census Area; Alaska, United States
- Parent range: Chugach Mountains
- Topo map: USGS Valdez A-6

East Peak is a 6,650-foot (2,027 m) glaciated mountain summit located in the Chugach Mountains, in the U.S. state of Alaska. The peak is situated 7 mi (11 km) east of Valdez, 10 mi (16 km) northeast of Mount Francis, and 4.5 mi (7 km) immediately north of Hogback Ridge. Although modest in elevation, relief is significant since the western aspect of the mountain rises up from tidewater of Prince William Sound in approximately six miles. The mountain received its descriptive name in 1898 from Captain William R. Abercrombie, who led an 1898 expedition seeking a route from coastal Alaska to the Klondike.

== Climate ==
Based on the Köppen climate classification, East Peak is located in a subarctic climate zone with long, cold, snowy winters, and mild summers. Weather fronts coming off the Gulf of Alaska are forced upwards by the Chugach Mountains (orographic lift), causing heavy precipitation in the form of rainfall and snowfall. Winter temperatures can drop below −20 °C with wind chill factors below −30 °C. This climate supports the Rubin, Keystone, and Camicia Glaciers, as well as smaller unnamed hanging glaciers surrounding the mountain.

== Gallery ==
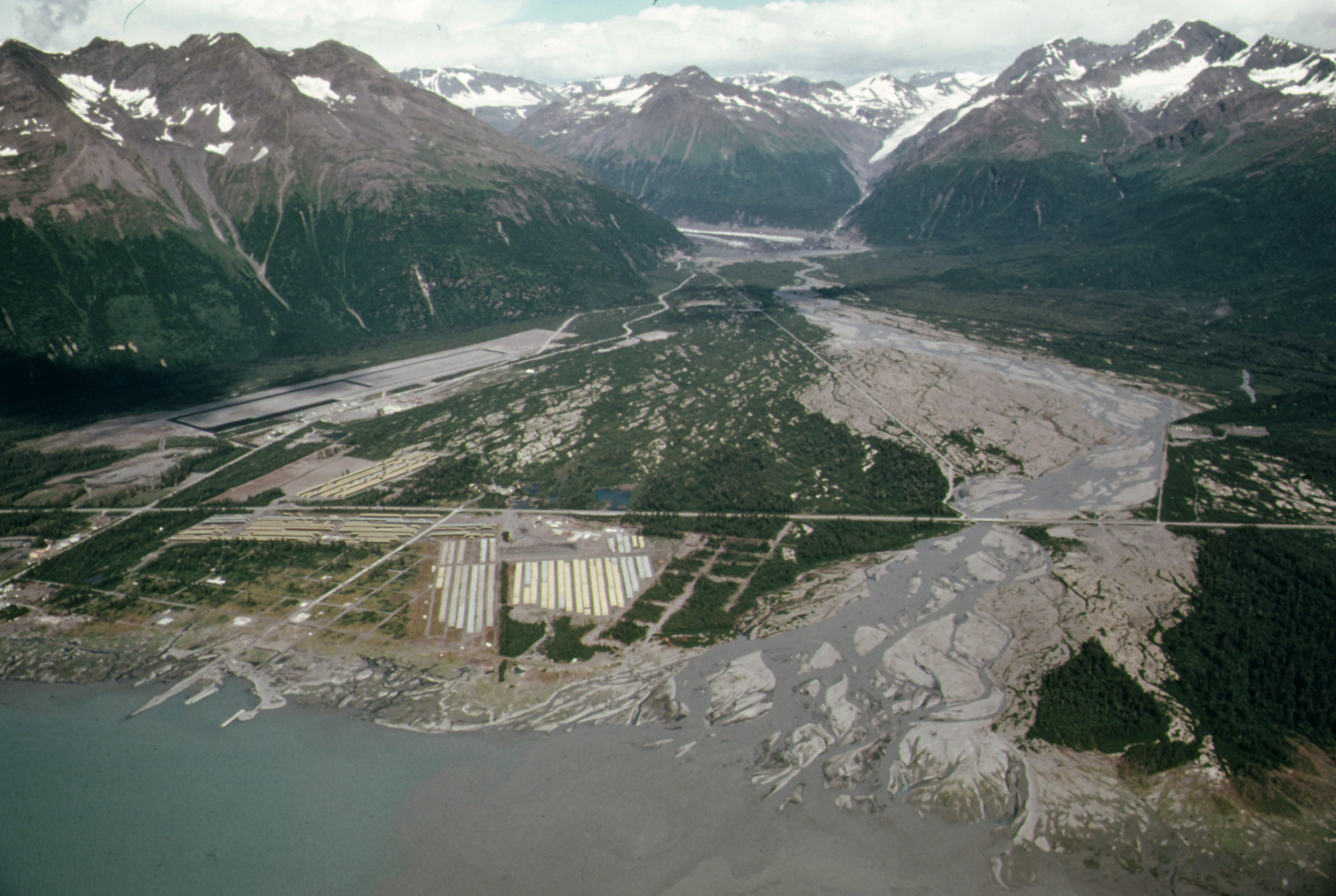
East Peak upper right, West Peak (left)

== See also ==
- List of mountain peaks of Alaska
- Geography of Alaska
