= List of waterfalls in Alaska =

This is a list of the (43) officially named waterfalls found in the state of Alaska in the United States, according to the United States Geological Survey Geographic Names Information System.

== List of waterfalls ==
Waterfall (Name, Borough/Census Area, Alaska)	Latitude	Longitude	GNIS Feature ID # Link	Coordinates	Elevation	Borough or Census area	Watercourse
Alaska Chief Falls	58.305000 N	134.340000 W	1893245	58°18′18″N 134°20′24″W	1,286 feet (392 m)	Juneau	Icy Gulch near confluence Gold Creek (near Lurvey Creek)
Beaver Falls (Alaska)	55.381667 N	131.522778 W	1420335	55°22′54″N 131°31′22″W	1,312 feet (400 m)	Ketchikan Gateway	Beaver Falls Creek between Upper & Lower Silvis Lake
Bridal Veil Falls (Skagway, Alaska)	59.569444 N	135.208333 W	1416669	59°34′10″N 135°12′30″W	2,802 feet (854 m)	Skagway	Tributary of Captain William Moore Creek (tributary of Skagway River)
Bridal Veil Falls (Valdez-Cordova Census Area, Alaska)	61.070278 N	145.893611 W	1417164	61°4′13″N 145°53′37″W	1,145 feet (349 m)	Valdez-Cordova (CA)	Tributary of Lowe River
Brooks Falls	58.555278 N	155.789722 W	1399475	58°33′19″N 155°47′23″W	92 feet (28 m)	Lake and Peninsula	Brooks River between Lake Brooks and Naknek Bay
Cheshnina Falls	61.858333 N	144.116389 W	1400211	61°51′30″N 144°6′59″W	4,610 feet (1,410 m)	Valdez-Cordova (CA)	Cheshnina River between Cheshnina Glacier & the Copper River
Chitistone Falls	61.547222 N	142.174722 W	1400340	61°32′50″N 142°10′29″W	3,743 feet (1,141 m)	Valdez-Cordova (CA)	Chitistone River at Chitistone Gorge
Cynthia Falls	59.786111 N	153.208611 W	1412879	59°47′10″N 153°12′31″W	604 feet (184 m)	Kenai Peninsula	Hardy Creek (tributary of Fitz Creek)
Ebner Falls	58.311944 N	134.375833 W	1401644	58°18′43″N 134°22′33″W	879 feet (268 m)	Juneau	Unknown Watercourse
Fish Ladder	55.293056 N	130.651944 W	1421940	55°17′35″N 130°39′7″W	148 feet (45 m)	Ketchikan Gateway	Unknown Watercourse
Fultons Falls	58.133333 N	155.016667 W	1866426	58°8′0″N 155°1′0″W	157 feet (48 m)	Kodiak Island	Unknown Watercourse
Golden Gate Falls			1402746	60°30′3″N 160°10′13″W	764 feet (233 m)	Bethel (CA)	Kisaralik River
Grindstone Falls (Alaska)	58.216667 N	134.250000 W	1894606	58°13′0″N 134°15′0″W	0 feet (0 m)	Juneau	Grindstone Creek
Hidden Falls (Alaska)	57.216389 N	134.874167 W	1422574	57°12′59″N 134°52′27″W	66 feet (20 m)	Sitka	between Hidden Falls Lake and Kasnyku Bay
Horsetail Falls (Alaska)	61.068056 N	145.905556 W	1417165	61°4′5″N 145°54′20″W	299 feet (91 m)	Valdez-Cordova (CA)	Lowe River
Kasnyku Falls	57.191111 N	134.832500 W	1422971	57°11′28″N 134°49′57″W	151 feet (46 m)	Sitka	Between Kasnyku Lake and Waterfall Cove
Kolevokharit Koygut Falls	59.7833333 N	158.5666667 W	1895213	59°47′0″N 158°34′0″W	666 feet (203 m)	Dillingham (CA)	Unnamed Stream
Liberty Falls	61.621389 N	144.545000 W	1405319	61°37′17″N 144°32′42″W	1,204 feet (367 m)	Valdez-Cordova (CA)	Liberty Creek (tributary Copper River)
Lost Rocker Falls	58.266667 N	134.316667 W	1895495	58°16′0″N 134°19′0″W	610 feet (190 m)	Juneau	Sheep Creek
Lower Falls (Alaska)			1405754	60°26′7″N 160°5′37″W	876 feet (267 m)	Bethel (CA)	Kisaralik River
Nugget Falls	58.4272 N	134.5367 W	Not recorded by the GNIS	58.4272°N 134.5367°W	377 feet (115 m)	Juneau (below Mendenhall Glacier)	Nugget Creek
Nutkwa Falls	55.118611 N	132.539444 W	1424029	55°7′7″N 132°32′22″W	30 feet (9.1 m)	Prince of Wales-Hyder (CA)	between Nutkwa Inlet and Nutkwa Lagoon
Ohman Falls	60.591389 N	145.583056 W	1424051	60°35′29″N 145°34′59″W	407 feet (124 m)	Valdez-Cordova (CA)	Power Creek
Petrof Falls	59.800000 N	154.950000 W	1896178	59°48′0″N 154°57′0″W	220 feet (67 m)	Lake and Peninsula	Newhalen River
Pitchfork Falls	59.531111 N	135.196389 W	1424288	59°31′52″N 135°11′47″W	2,119 feet (646 m)	Skagway	Outlet Stream from Goat Lake to Skagway River
Rainbow Falls (Alaska)	56.422778 N	132.332778 W	1424726	56°25′22″N 132°19′58″W	535 feet (163 m)	Wrangell	Unknown Watercourse
Reid Falls	59.473333 N	135.284722 W	1424799	59°28′24″N 135°17′5″W	446 feet (136 m)	Skagway	Unknown Watercourse
Rudleston Falls	61.084167 N	145.891111 W	1417163	61°5′3″N 145°53′28″W	869 feet (265 m)	Valdez-Cordova (CA)	Lowe River
Sahlin Falls	60.694444 N	145.966944 W	1414404	60°41′40″N 145°58′1″W	210 feet (64 m)	Valdez-Cordova (CA)	Sahlin Creek, near its mouth at Sheep Bay
Silver Falls (Alaska)	55.979167 N	130.053056 W	1414713	55°58′45″N 130°3′11″W	443 feet (135 m)	Prince of Wales-Hyder (CA)	Fish Creek, near Logjam Creek
Silver Salmon Falls	55.791389 N	133.094722 W	1414717	55°47′29″N 133°5′41″W	108 feet (33 m)	Prince of Wales-Hyder (CA)	Stanley Creek (tributary Lester River)
Sockeye Falls	55.916667 N	133.000000 W	1877213	55°55′0″N 133°0′0″W	151 feet (46 m)	Petersburg	Lyman Creek?
Suicide Falls	58.275556 N	134.353611 W	1410316	58°16′32″N 134°21′13″W	249 feet (76 m)	Juneau	Cross Bay Creek (tributary of Gastineau Channel)
Sweetheart Falls	57.945278 N	133.676667 W	1415133	57°56′43″N 133°40′36″W	446 feet (136 m)	Juneau	Sweetheart Creek between Lower Sweetheart Lake and Gilbert Bay
The Falls (Hoonah-Angoon Census Area, Alaska)	57.557778 N	134.354167 W	1415239	57°33′28″N 134°21′15″W	72 feet (22 m)	Hoonah-Angoon (CA)	between Salt Lake and Mitchell Bay
The Falls (Southeast Fairbanks Census Area, Alaska)	64.929444 N	141.825833 W	1410799	64°55′46″N 141°49′33″W	1,309 feet (399 m)	Southeast Fairbanks (CA)	Seventymile River
Thunder Bird Falls	61.442500 N	149.355556 W	1416869	61°26′33″N 149°21′20″W	446 feet (136 m)	Anchorage	Thunder Bird Creek (tributary of Eklutna River)
Tikchik Falls			1896967	59°54′0″N 158°8′0″W	377 feet (115 m)	Dillingham (CA)	Nuyakuk River
Upper Falls (Alaska)			1411561	60°21′49″N 159°56′30″W	1,230 feet (370 m)	Bethel (CA)	tributary ?
White Falls (1), (Aleutians West, Alaska)	51.786111 N	176.798611 W	1419716	51°47′10″N 176°47′55″W	0 feet (0 m)	Aleutians West (CA)	Unknown Watercourse
White Falls (2), (Aleutians West, Alaska)	51.784722 N	175.768056 W	1897293	51°47′5″N 175°46′5″W	0 feet (0 m)		
Whiting Falls	60.990833 N	144.842500 W	1415750	60°59′27″N 144°50′33″W	732 feet (223 m)	Valdez-Cordova (CA)	tributary of Copper River
Wolf Pass Falls	55.733889 N	132.856944 W	1985292	55°44′2″N 132°51′25″W	1,975 feet (602 m)	Prince of Wales-Hyder (CA)	Tributary of Thorne River?
Wolverine Falls (Alaska)	58.547222 N	154.719444 W	1897338	58°32′50″N 154°43′10″W	771 feet (235 m)	Lake and Peninsula	Rainbow River (tributary of Savonoski River)

== See also ==
- List of waterfalls
