= Mount Francis (Alaska) =

Mountain in Alaska, United States

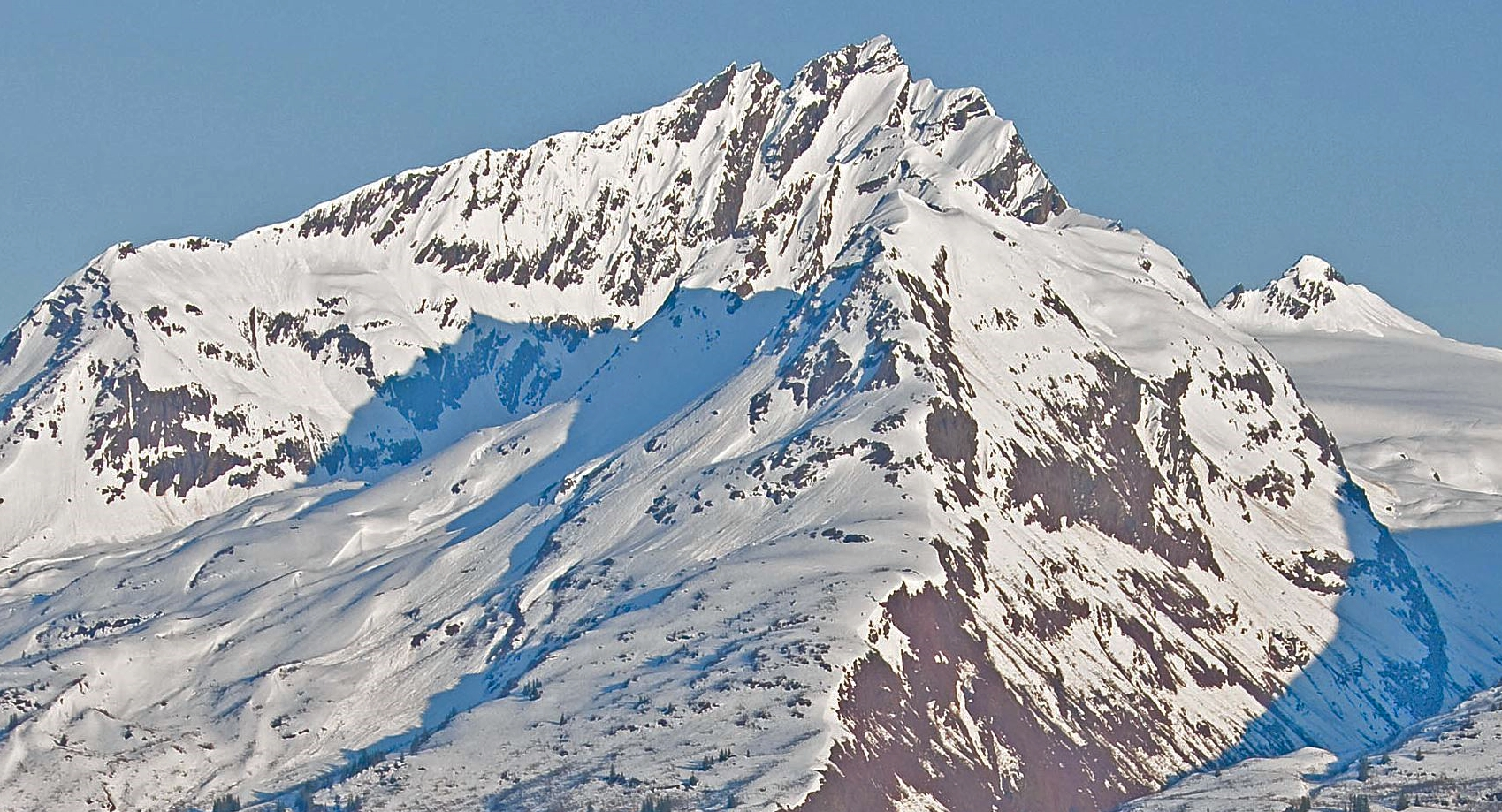
- Mount Francis, north aspect

Highest point
- Elevation: 5,426 ft (1,654 m)
- Prominence: 1,654 ft (504 m)
- Isolation: 5.9 mi (9.5 km)
- Coordinates: 61°02′30″N 146°12′22″W

Geography
- Location within Alaska
- Interactive map of Mount Francis
- Location: Chugach Census Area; Alaska, United States
- Parent range: Chugach Mountains
- Topo map: USGS Valdez A-6

Mount Francis is a 5,426-foot (1,654 m) glaciated mountain summit located in the Chugach Mountains, in the U.S. state of Alaska. This landform is situated 6 mi (10 km) southeast of Valdez, 9 mi (14 km) southwest of Hogback Ridge, and 9 mi (14 km) northwest of Meteorite Mountain. This feature was named in 1898 by Captain William R. Abercrombie who led an 1898 expedition seeking a route from coastal Alaska to the Klondike. Precipitation runoff and meltwater from the mountain's glaciers drains into tributaries of the Lowe River, which in turn empties to Prince William Sound.

== Climate ==
Based on the Köppen climate classification, Mount Francis is located in a subarctic climate zone with long, cold, snowy winters, and cool summers. Weather systems coming off the Gulf of Alaska are forced upwards by the Chugach Mountains (orographic lift), causing heavy precipitation in the form of rainfall and snowfall. Temperatures can drop below −20 °C with wind chill factors below −30 °C. The months May through June offer the most favorable weather for viewing and climbing.

== Gallery ==
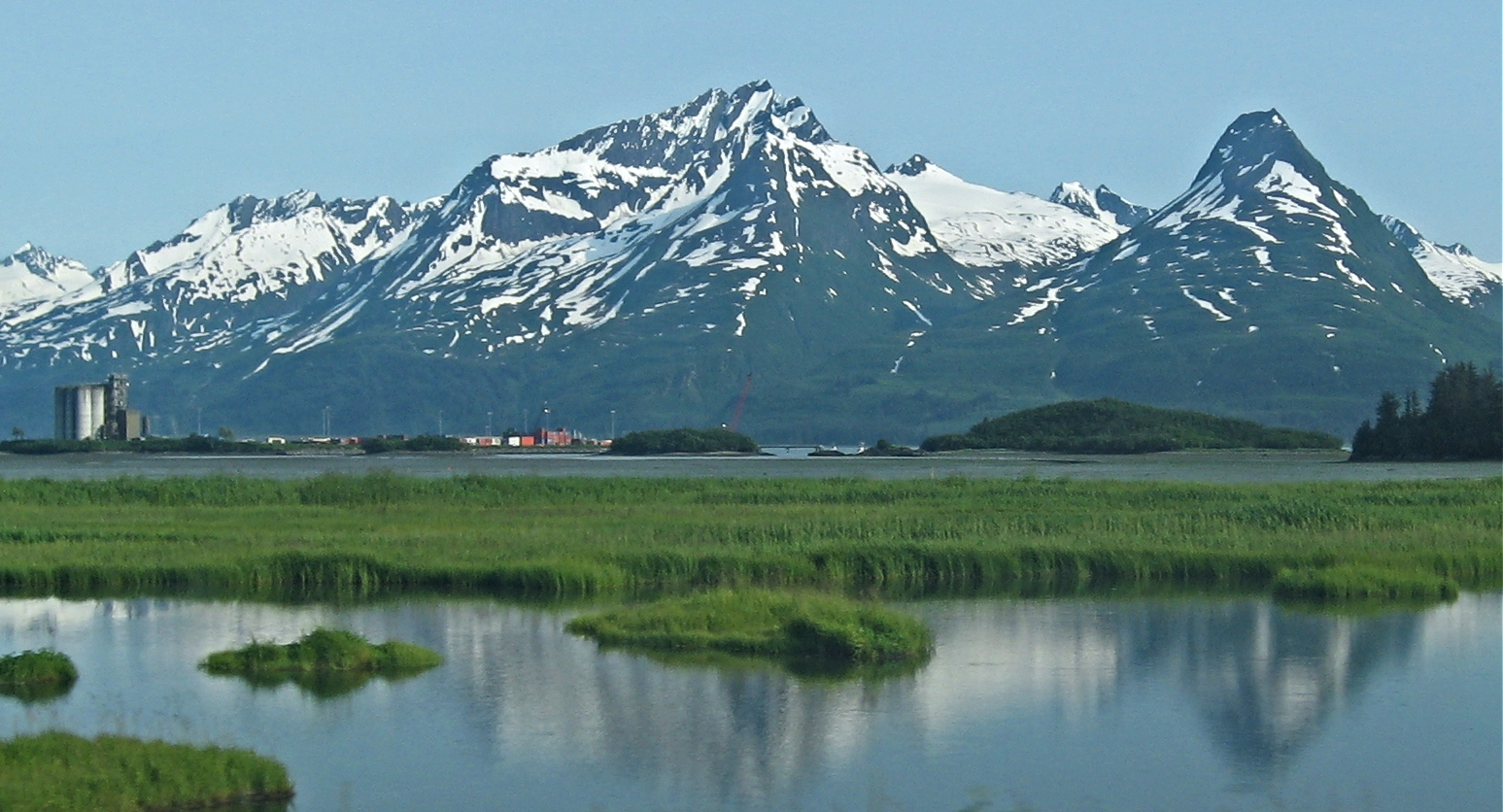
Mt. Francis with Sugarloaf Mountain (right)

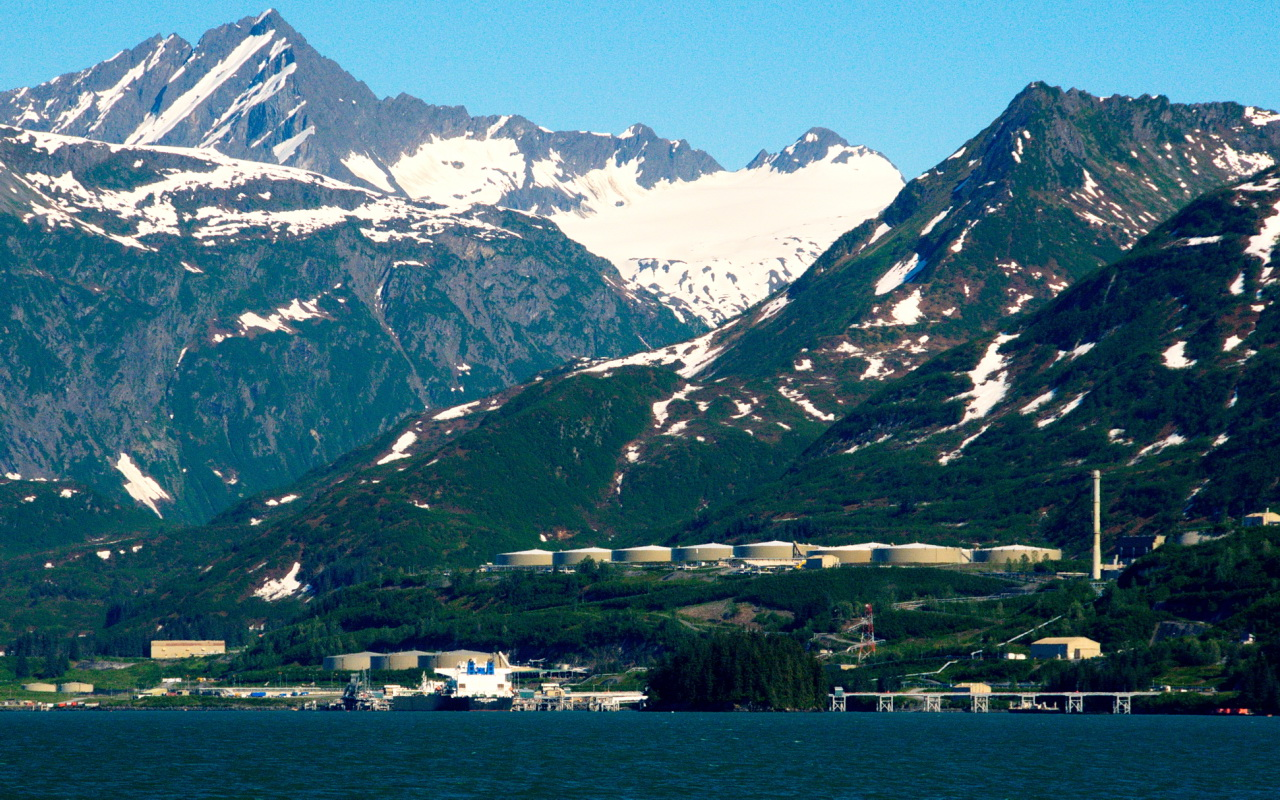
Mt. Francis (upper left) and pipeline terminal

== See also ==
- List of mountain peaks of Alaska
- Geography of Alaska
