= Port Valdez =

Bay in Prince William Sound, Alaska

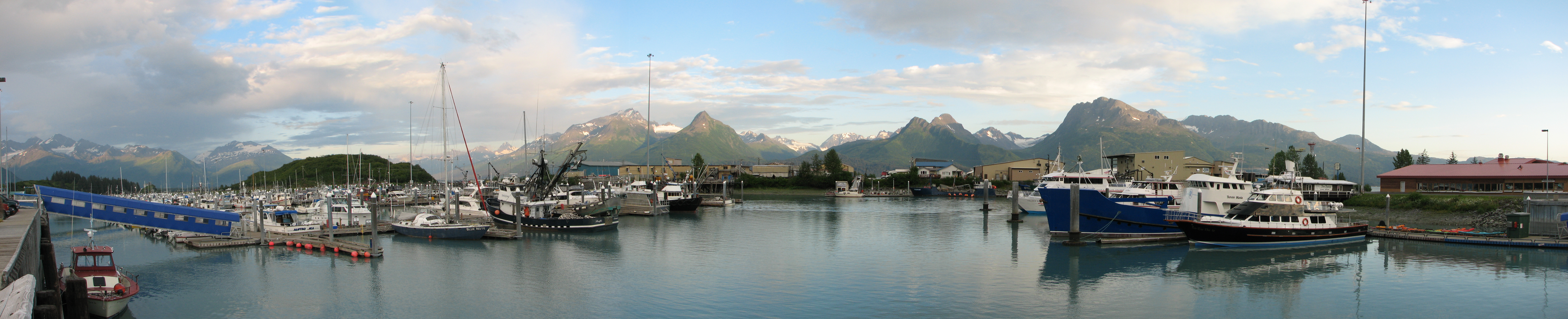
- View of Port Valdez from the Port of Valdez

- Location within Alaska
- Location: Prince William Sound, Alaska
- Coordinates: 61.105°N 146.475°W
- Primary inflows: Valdez River, Lowe River, Mineral Creek, Solomon Gulch
- Basin countries: United States
- Max. length: 13 mi (21 km)
- Max. width: 3 mi (4.8 km)
- Average depth: 500 ft (150 m)
- Max. depth: 787 ft (240 m)
- Frozen: Never
- Islands: Entrance Island, Saw Island
- Sections/sub-basins: Shoup Bay, Anderson Bay, Valdez Narrows
- Settlements: Valdez

Port Valdez is a fjord of Prince William Sound in Alaska, United States. Its main settlement is Valdez, located near the head of the bay. It marks the southern terminus of the Trans-Alaska Pipeline System. The bay is oriented east-west and its western end is connected to the larger Valdez Arm via the Valdez Narrows. It received its name from being in proximity to the town of Valdez.
