= Blueberry Hill (Alaska) =

Hill near Valdez, Alaska

Coordinates: 61°07′36″N 146°22′48″W

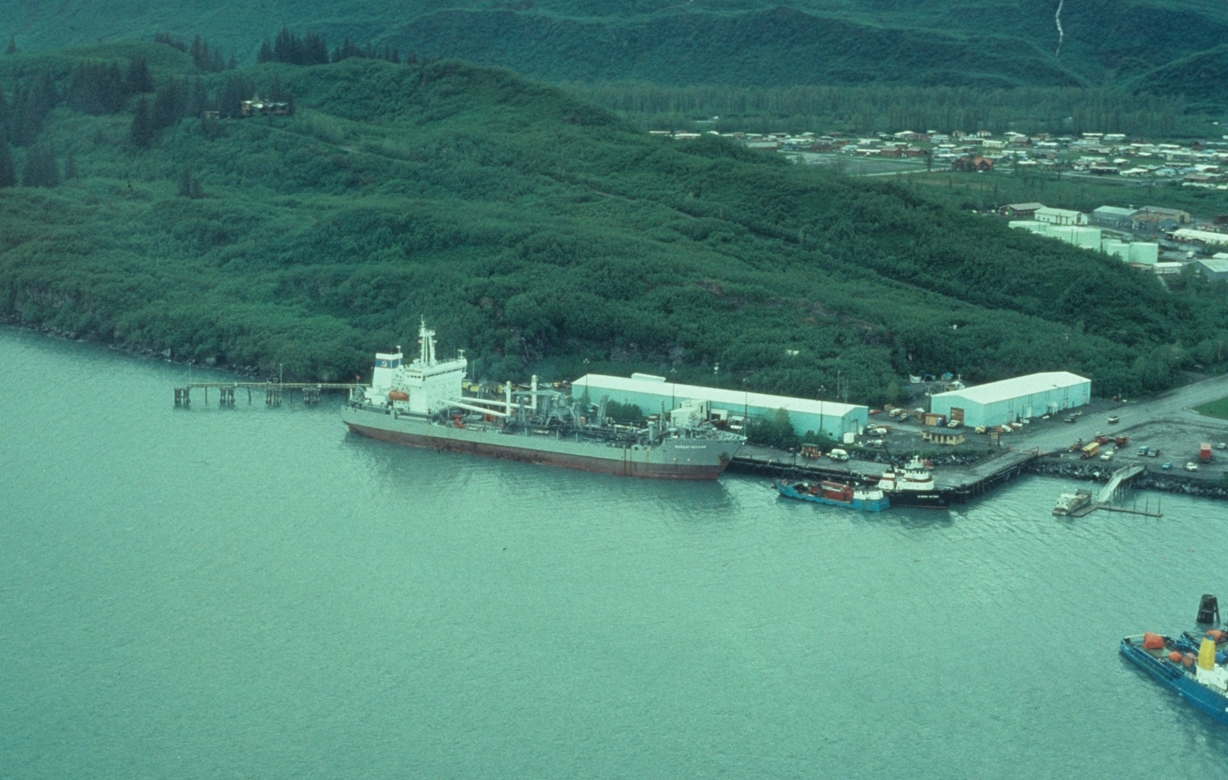
Aerial view of Blueberry Hill as it appeared in 1989. The marine facilities in the foreground have expanded considerably since this photo was taken.

Blueberry Hill (also known as Meals Hill) is located near downtown Valdez, Alaska.

== Location ==
Blueberry Hill is on the north shore of the Valdez Bay. The elevation of Blueberry Hill is 351 feet (107 m). On the west side of Blueberry Hill, a grove of Sitka Spruce make up the northernmost forest in the Pacific temperate rain forest system. The coastal rain forest on Blueberry Hill is approximately one square kilometer. Black bears and bald eagles inhabit the forest on Blueberry Hill.

Blueberry Hill is the largest in a system of hills that border the Valdez Bay. East of Blueberry Hill is Salmonberry or Civic Center Hill, named for the abundant wild salmonberries that grow on the northern shores of Ruth Pond. Southeast of the small boat harbor is Hippie Hill, named after the seasonal workers that inhabited the campground on Hippie Hill during the 1980s and 1990s. The Blueberry Hill network contains the Mineral Creek Islands east of town in the Valdez Tide Flats.

Blueberry Hill and all the hills in Blueberry Hill group are composed of metamorphic schist. Undisturbed exposed rock is visible on many of the cliff beaches surrounding the town of Valdez.
