= Shoup Bay =

Bay in Prince William Sound, Alaska

- Location within Alaska
- Location: Prince William Sound, Alaska
- Coordinates: 61.138°N 146.590°W
- Primary inflows: Shoup Glacier, McCallister Creek, Palmer Creek, Uno Creek
- Basin countries: United States
- Max. length: 3 mi (4.8 km)
- Max. width: 2 mi (3.2 km)
- Max. depth: ~200 ft (61 m)
- Frozen: Never
- Islands: 3

Shoup Bay is an inlet of Port Valdez inside the Valdez Arm of Prince William Sound in Alaska. steep-walled, flat-bottomed basin with a depth of approximately 200 ft. described as a hanging valley that formed during more extensive Pleistocene glaciation. Located eight miles west of Valdez, Alaska, United States, it is fed by Shoup Glacier, as well as McCallister Creek, Palmer Creek, and Uno Creek. The bay itself opens into the Valdez Narrows and is included as part of the Shoup Bay State Marine Park.

== Etymology ==
Shoup Bay is an Ice Age remnant but its name is far more recent: as late as the early 1900s, the nearby glacier was referred to as "Canyon Creek Glacier"; it wasn't until 1899 that Captain W. R. Abercrombie had the local name "Shoup" reported to him, referring to the glacier, and it wasn't until 1905 that the U.S. Geological Survey (USGS) noted the waterway as Shoup Bay.

== Shoup Bay State Marine Park ==
Shoup Bay State Marine Park is located five miles southwest of the Port of Valdez. The primary access is by boat, although an 11-mile trail from Valdez to the park is available. The bay is famous for the 150-foot tidal wave, which supposedly surged in and out of the bay three times during the 1964 earthquake. The bay has changed substantially since then, in large part due to the swiftly receding Shoup Glacier, which has lost roughly a mile and a half of depth since it was first recorded by the USGS changing the terrain. Because of the glacier's close proximity, icebergs can often be found floating in the bay.

Due to a cold microclimate, timber is sparse in the Shoup Glacier valley, with the uplands consisting mostly of new growth forest of alder and spruce. The surrounding mountain walls are very steep, providing habitat for mountain goats and black bear. Waterfowl flock in abundance here, from the black-legged kittiwake rookery in the lagoon to bald eagles and arctic terns.
