= Hogback Ridge =

Mountain ridge in Alaska, United States

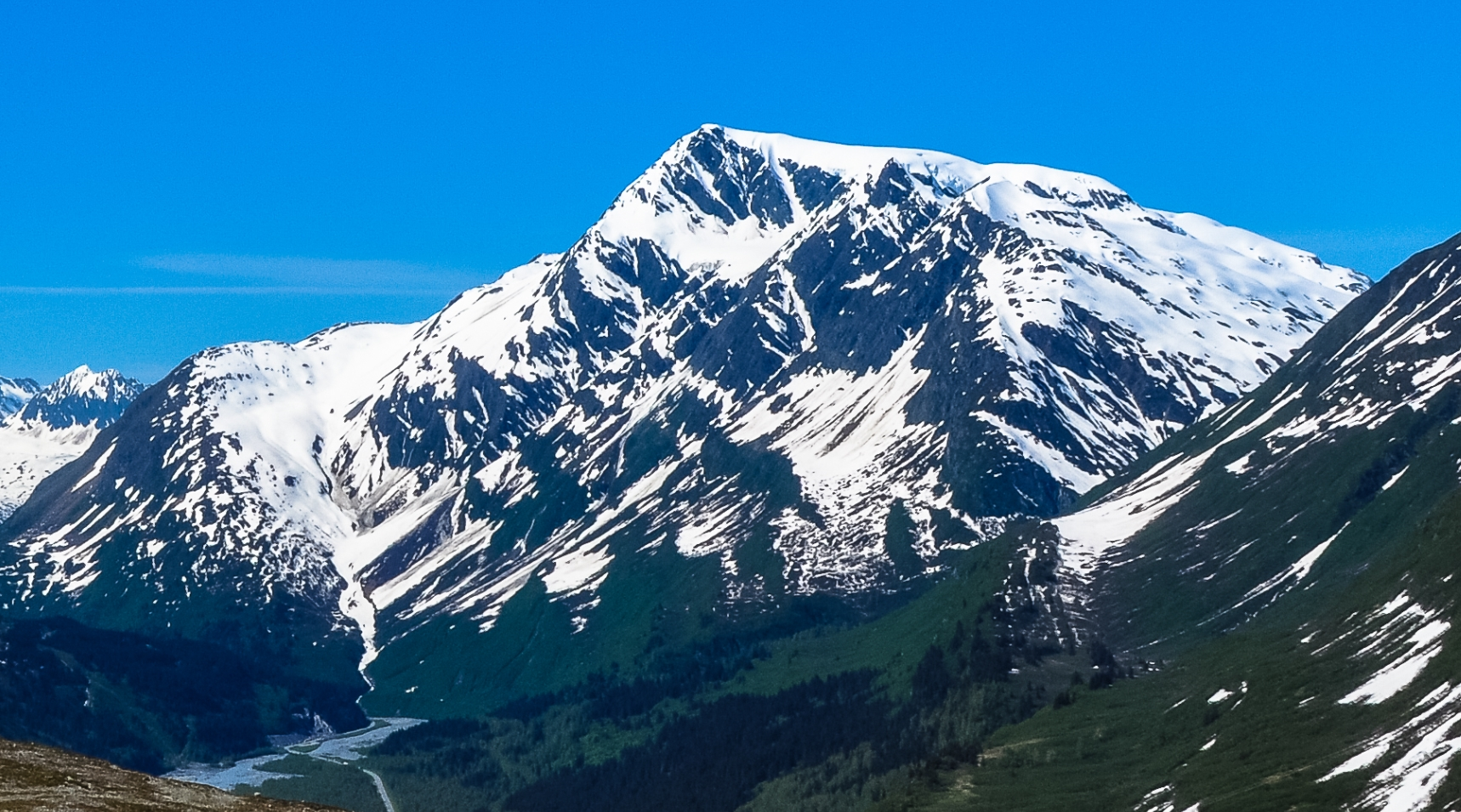
- Hogback's east aspect, from Thompson Pass

Highest point
- Elevation: 6,135 ft (1,870 m)
- Prominence: 2,198 ft (670 m)
- Parent peak: East Peak
- Isolation: 4.35 mi (7.00 km)
- Coordinates: 61°05′24″N 145°59′00″W

Geography
- Location within Alaska
- Interactive map of Hogback Ridge
- Location: Chugach Census Area; Alaska, United States
- Parent range: Chugach Mountains
- Topo map: USGS Valdez A-6

Hogback Ridge is a 6,135-foot (1,870 m) glaciated mountain ridge located in the Chugach Mountains, in the U.S. state of Alaska. This landform is situated 9 mi (14 km) east of Valdez, 9 mi (14 km) west of Thompson Pass, and the Richardson Highway traverses the southern base of the mountain. This feature takes its name from the Hogback Glacier on its northern slopes, and in turn the glacier was named in 1898 by Captain William R. Abercrombie. Abercrombie led an 1898 expedition seeking a route from coastal Alaska to the Klondike. Precipitation runoff and meltwater from the mountain's glaciers drains into tributaries of the Lowe River, which in turn empties to Prince William Sound. The famous Horsetail Falls, which is located in Keystone Canyon, receives its source from the south slope of the mountain.

== Climate ==
Based on the Köppen climate classification, Hogback Ridge is located in a subarctic climate zone with long, cold, snowy winters, and cool summers. Temperatures can drop below −20 °C with wind chill factors below −30 °C. This climate supports the Corbin, Keystone, and Hogback Glaciers on the mountain. The months May through June offer the most favorable weather for viewing and climbing.

== Gallery ==
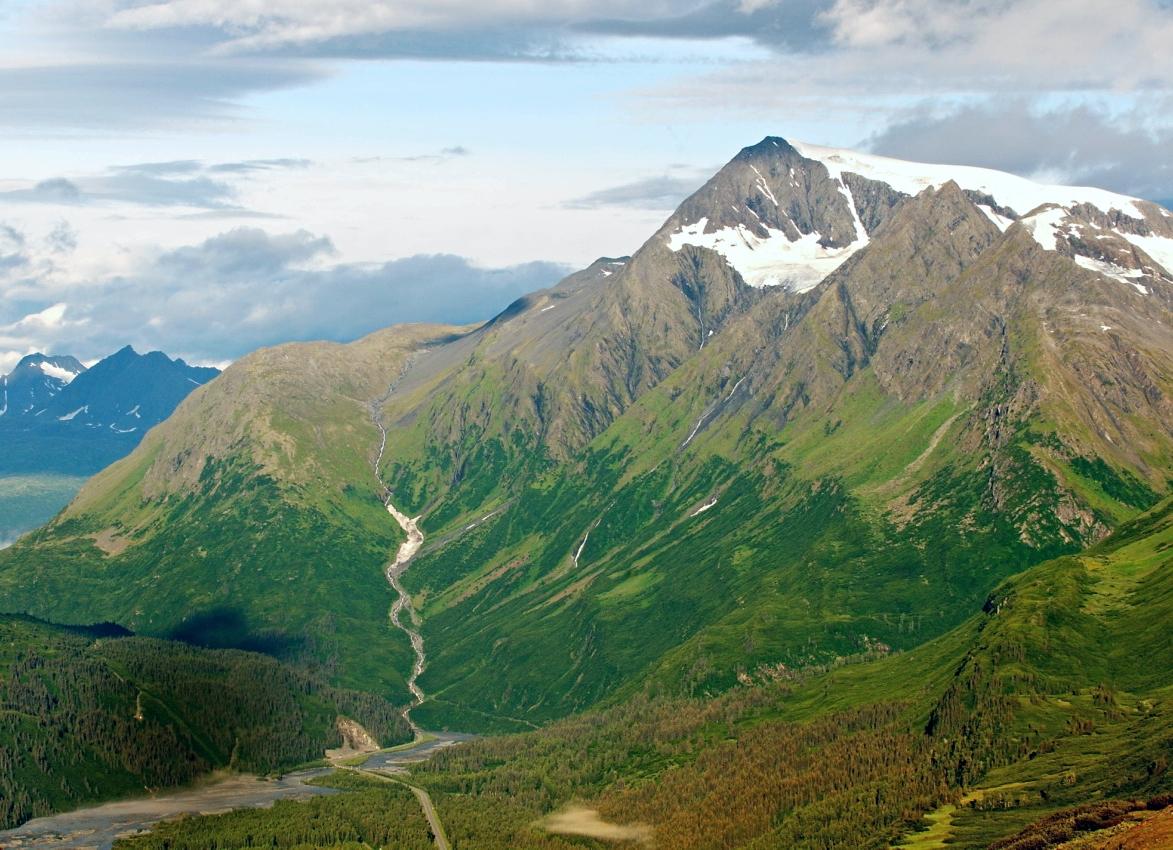
Hogback Ridge

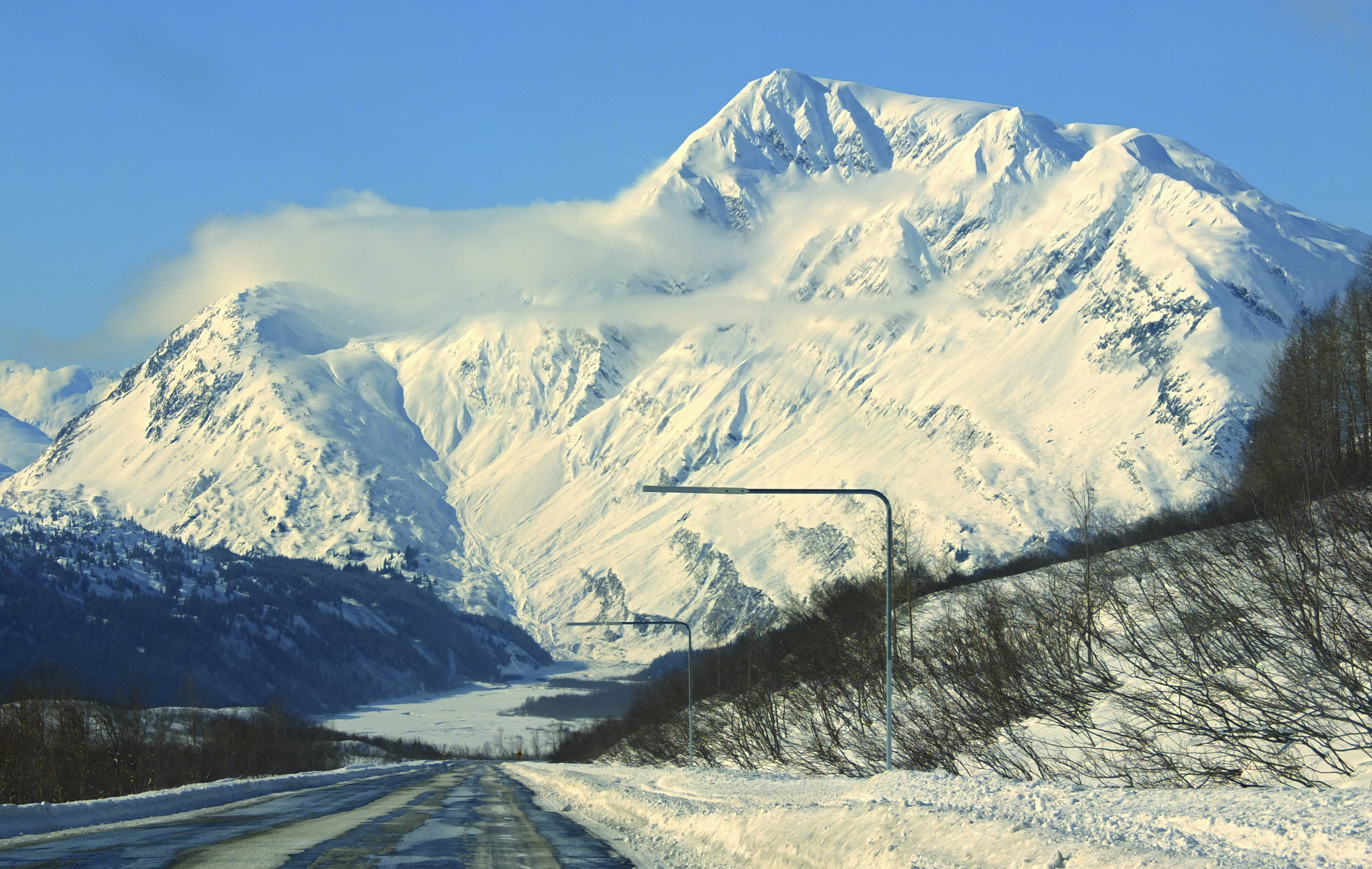
Hogback Ridge in winter

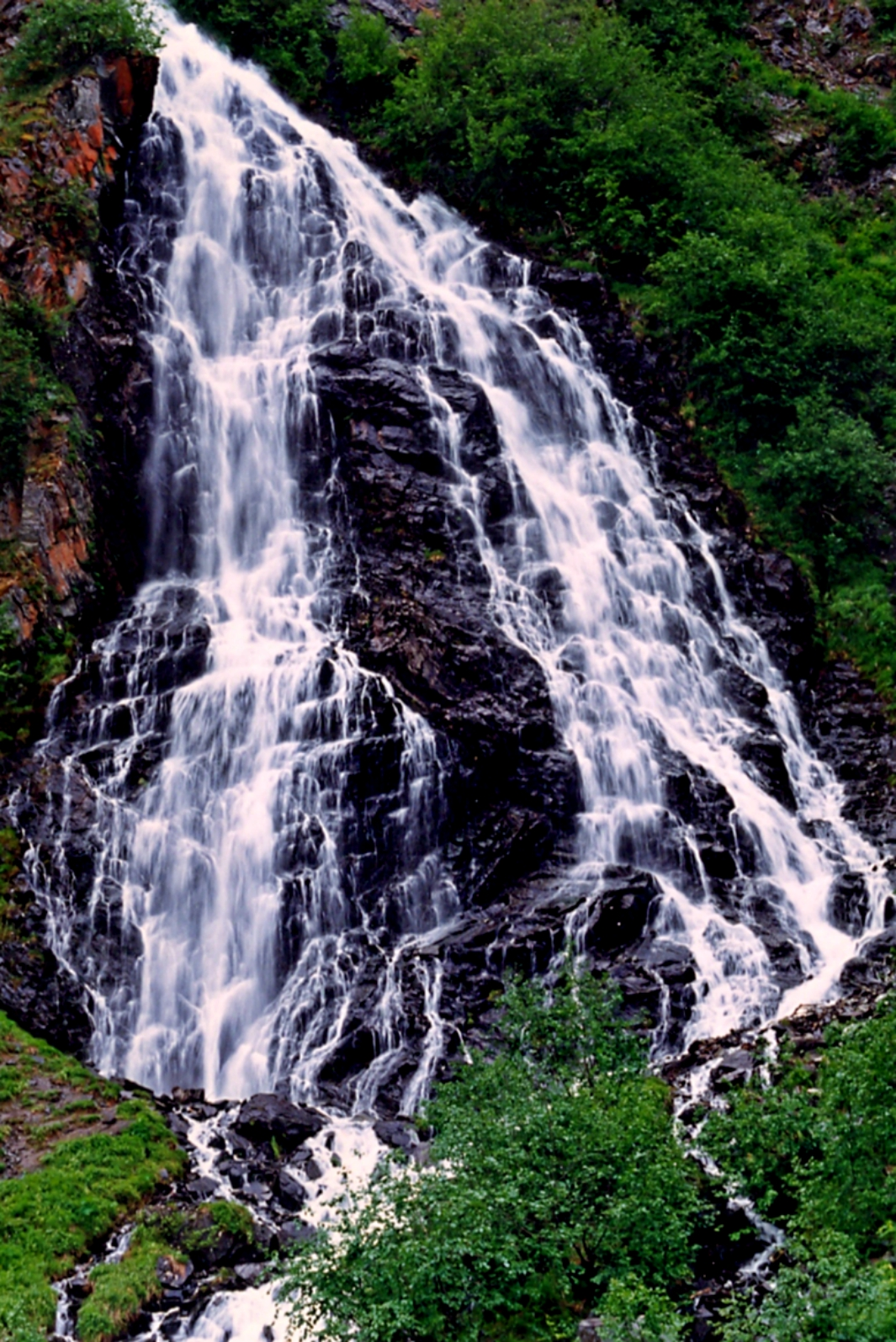
Horsetail Falls

== See also ==
- Geography of Alaska
