= Soroe Maersk =

Container ship

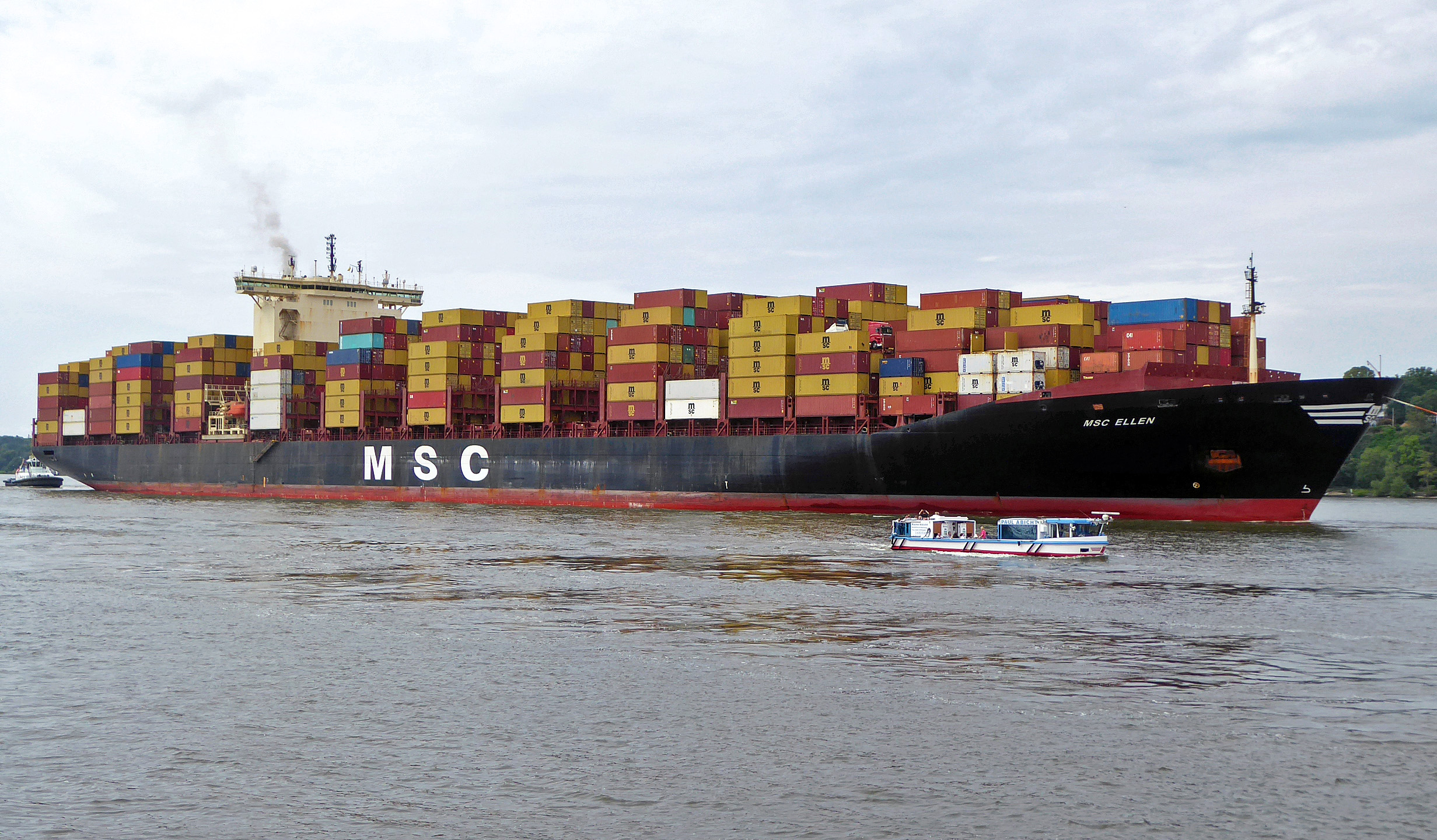

History
- Name: Sorø Mærsk
- Owner: Tailong International Ship Lease Co., Limited
- Operator: Maersk Line
- Port of registry: Munkebo, Denmark
- Builder: Odense Steel Shipyard
- Yard number: 167
- Laid down: 1 January 1999
- Launched: 23 April 1999
- Identification: IMO number: 9166780; MMSI number: 219802000; Callsign: OYKJ2
- Status: In service

General characteristics
- Class & type: Sovereign Maersk-class container ship
- Tonnage: 92,198 GT; 110,387 DWT
- Length: 346.98m
- Beam: 42.8m
- Draft: 14.52m
- Speed: Max 25 Knots (46 km/h; 28 mph)
- Capacity: 9,640 TEU

Soroe Maersk is a container ship. She was launched on 23 April 1999.

Soroe is powered by a B&W 2 stroke engine. This engine is DFM powered and has an output of 81600 bhp at 91 RPM. She has a maximum speed of 25 knots. The cargo container load is 9,640 TEU.
