= SD Atlas =

History

United Kingdom
- Name: SD Atlas
- Operator: Serco Marine Services
- In service: 2005
- Home port: HMNB Portsmouth
- Identification: IMO number: 9193068; MMSI number: 235024715; Callsign: MHGJ4
- Status: Retired

General characteristics
- Tonnage: 88 GRT
- Length: 21.3 metres (70 ft)
- Beam: 7.6 metres (25 ft)
- Draught: 3.3 metres (11 ft)
- Installed power: Bollard pull: 33 tonnes
- Complement: 8

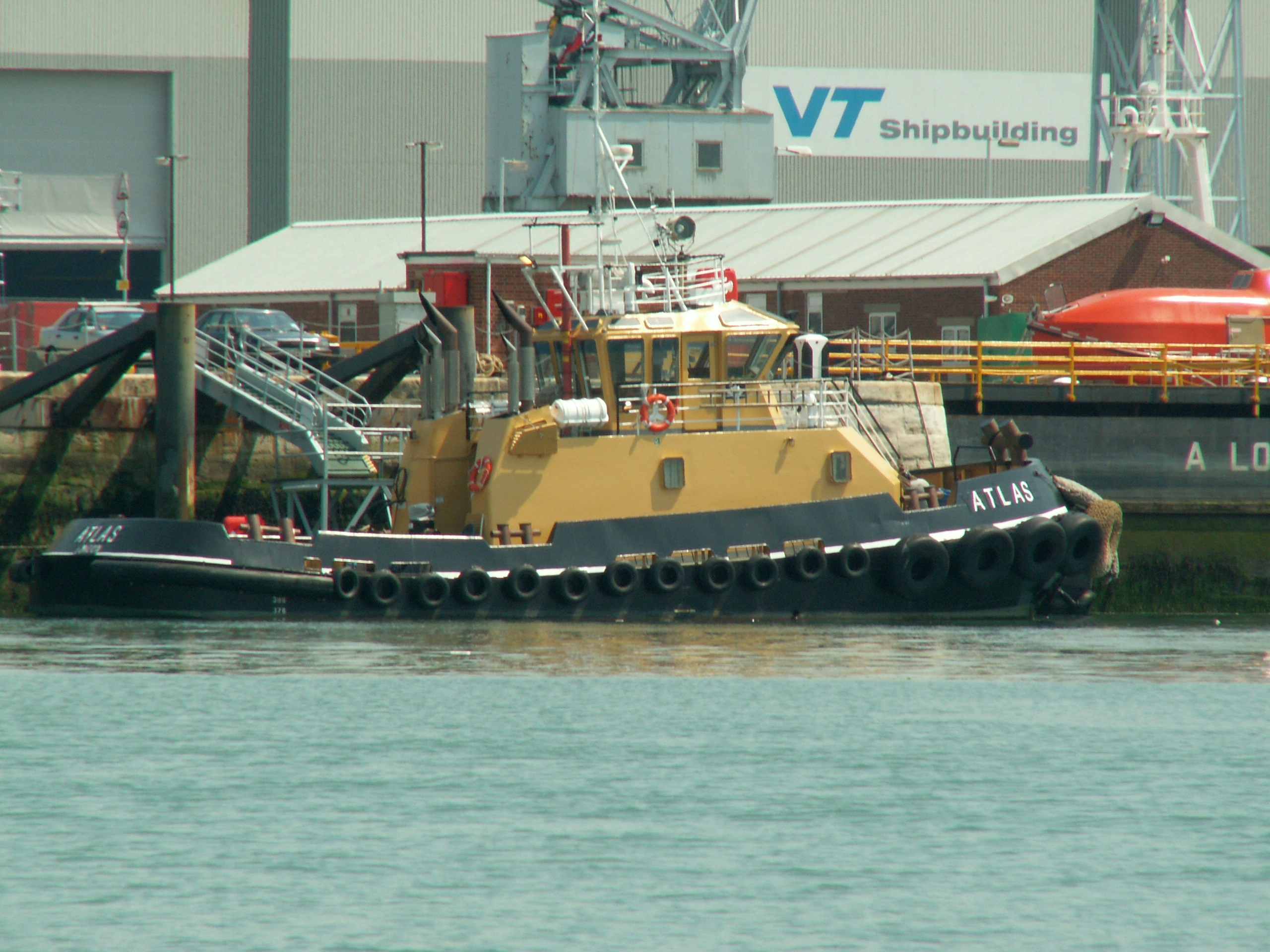
Atlas, Portsmouth, UK (7 June 2006)

SD Atlas was a tugboat in service with Serco Marine Services at HMNB Portsmouth, where she worked in support of the United Kingdom's Naval Service.

She was built in Uzmar, Turkey in 1999, and was originally named MT Yenikale. The ship was chartered by Serco Denholm in 2005, and is named after the original Atlas, a tug built at Chatham Dockyard in 1909.

== See also ==
- Naval Service (United Kingdom)
- List of ships of Serco Marine Services
