= MV Spiegelgracht =

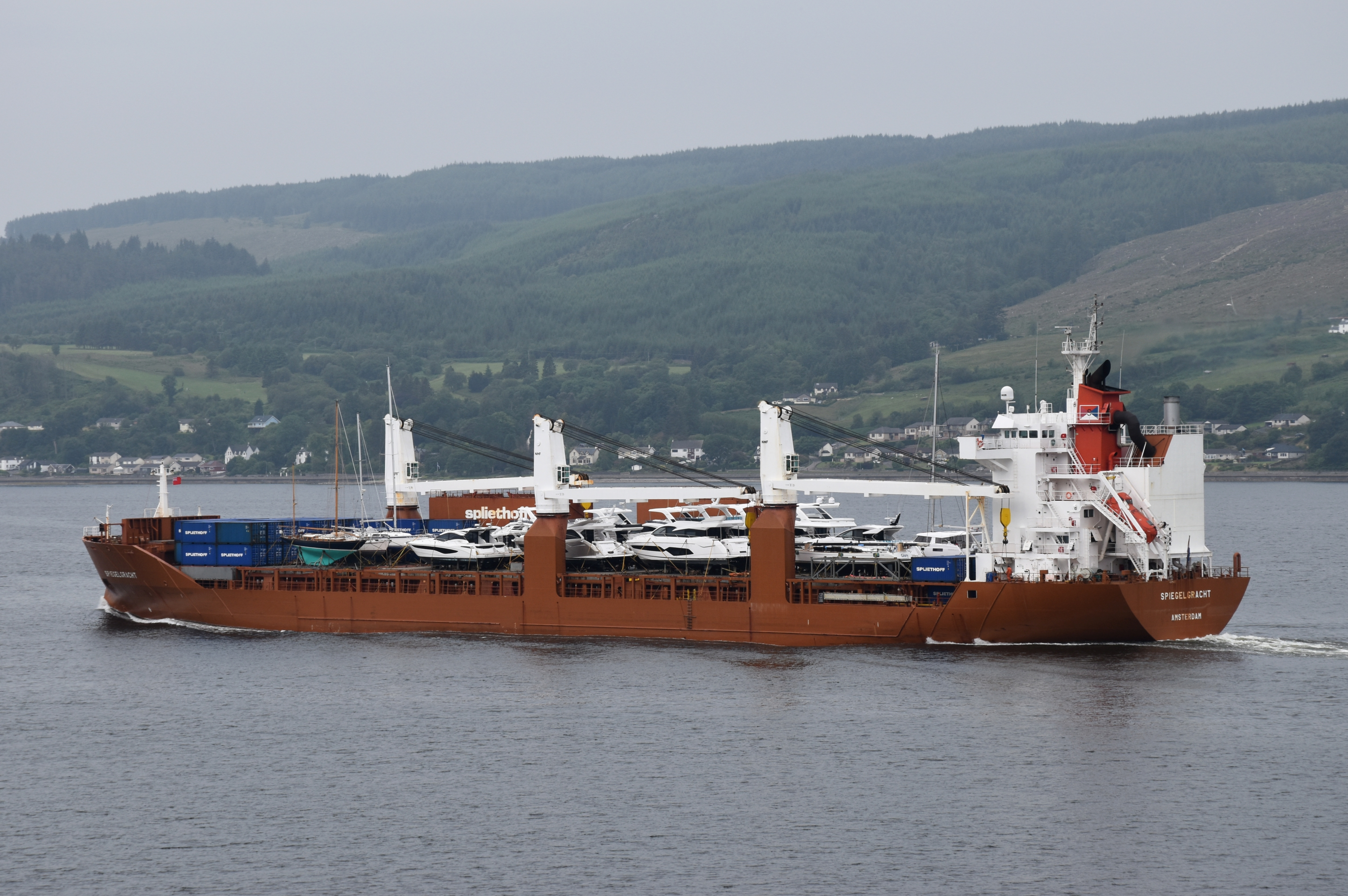
- Spiegelgracht on the Firth of Clyde, 2019

History

Netherlands
- Name: Spiegelgracht
- Owner: Spliethoff Group
- Port of registry: Amsterdam, Netherlands
- Builder: Tsuneishi Shipbuilding Company, Hiroshima, Japan
- Yard number: 1173
- Launched: 28 August 1999
- Completed: 18 April 2000
- In service: 2000–present
- Identification: IMO number: 9197911; MMSI number: 245789000; Call sign: PCEO
- Status: In service

General characteristics
- Type: General cargo ship
- Tonnage: 16,641 GT; 6,700 NT; 21,402 DWT
- Length: 168 m (551 ft) (overall)
- Installed power: Wärtsilä 6L64, 12,060 kW (16,170 hp)

MV Spiegelgracht is a general cargo ship, operated by Spliethoff Group's bevrachtingskantoor. She was launched in 1999.

== Service history ==
Spiegelgracht was built in Japan by the Tsuneishi Shipbuilding Company, under the construction hull number 1172. She entered service with Spliethoff's Bevrachtingskantoor, a Netherlands-based shipping company, in January 2000. Spiegelgracht is employed on numerous services for the company, including the collection of pleasure yachts from European ports – including Palma, Majorca and Southampton – in November of every year, and sailing them across the Atlantic to locations in the Caribbean for the winter cruising season. She then returns them to the Mediterranean every May for the summer cruising season.

Spiegelgracht is also used to transport a wide range of general cargo, sometimes being used on a regular service between the Baltic and North West Europe and the USA; the ship also often makes transits through the Kiel Canal between the Baltic and North Sea. In 2011 Spiegelgracht and another company ship, Deltagracht, transported disassembled wind turbines manufactured by the Danish company Vestas. Spiegelgracht carried 10 turbines from Esbjerg to Curaçao, in the Dutch Antilles, while Deltagracht carried 21 destined for Portland, Victoria.
