= Japanese submarine Makishio =

At least two warships of Japan have been named Makishio:

- JDS Makishio (SS-567), an Uzushio-class submarine launched in 1971 and struck in 1988.
- JDS Makishio (SS-593), an Oyashio-class submarine launched in 1999
