= Tan'erliq =

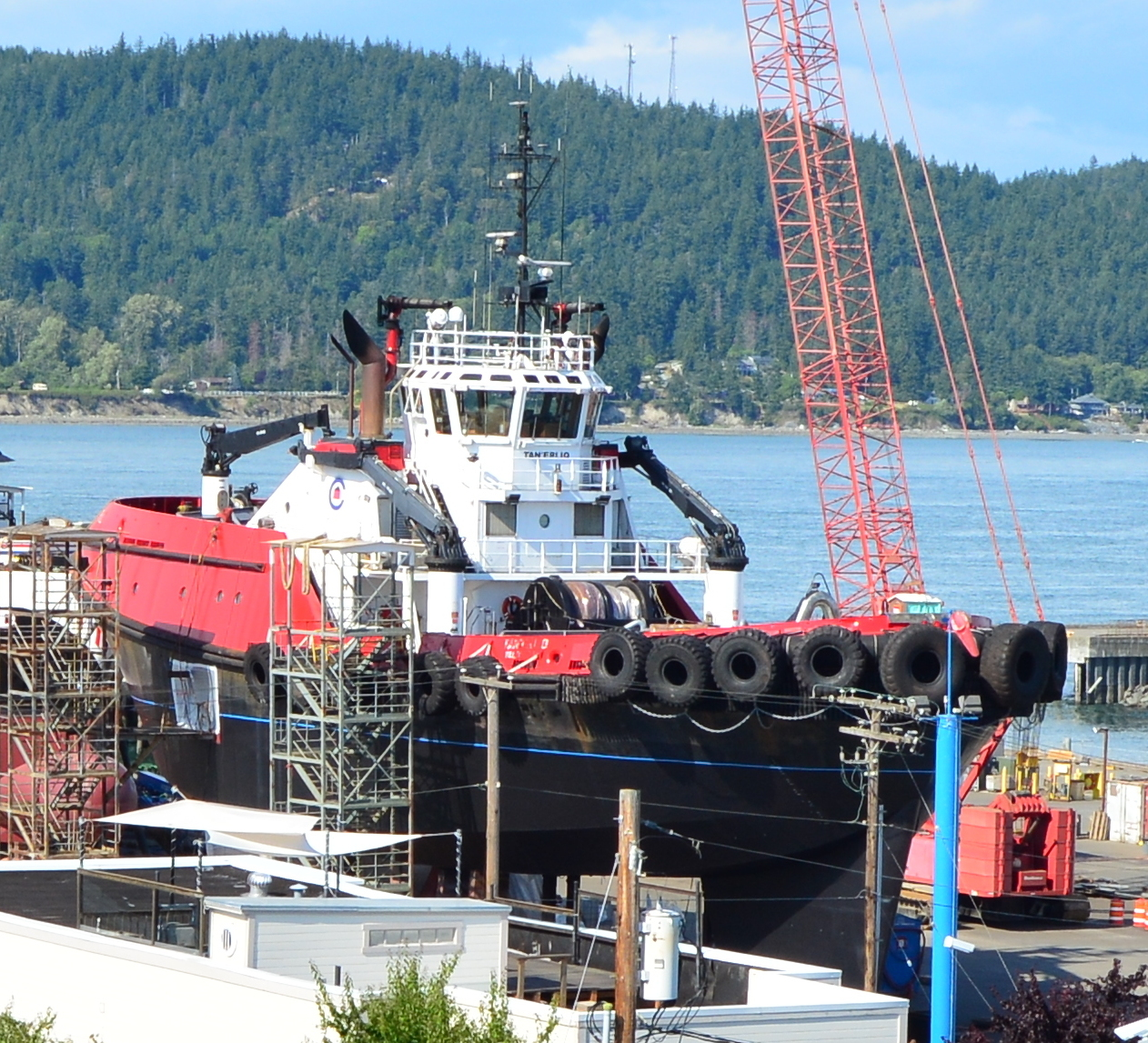
- Tan'erliq at Anacortes, Washington, 2019

History
- Namesake: Alutiiq word for black bear
- Owner: Vessel Management Services Inc.
- Operator: Crowley Maritime
- Ordered: 1999 (built)
- Builder: Dakota Creek Industries, Anacortes, Washington
- Yard number: 34
- Identification: IMO number: 9178381

General characteristics
- Tonnage: 484 GT, 329 NT
- Length: 139.7 ft (42.6 m)
- Beam: 48 ft (15 m)
- Draft: 20 ft (6.1 m)
- Installed power: 2 × Caterpillar 3612 engines 10,192 hp (7,600 kW)
- Propulsion: Voith-Schneider Cycloidal
- Speed: 14.5 kn (26.9 km/h; 16.7 mph)

Tan'erliq (pronounced tun-ul-lik) is a ship escort, rescue and oil response oceangoing tugboat operated by Crowley Maritime and stationed in Prince William Sound, Alaska. In addition to Tan'erliq, her sister ship Nanuq is also stationed in Valdez, Alaska.

These two vessels, in addition to a dozen other units, escort and protect the waters of Prince William Sound, site of the Exxon Valdez-oil spill in 1989.
