= Lowe River =

River in Alaska, United States

Coordinates: 61°05′29″N 146°14′54″W

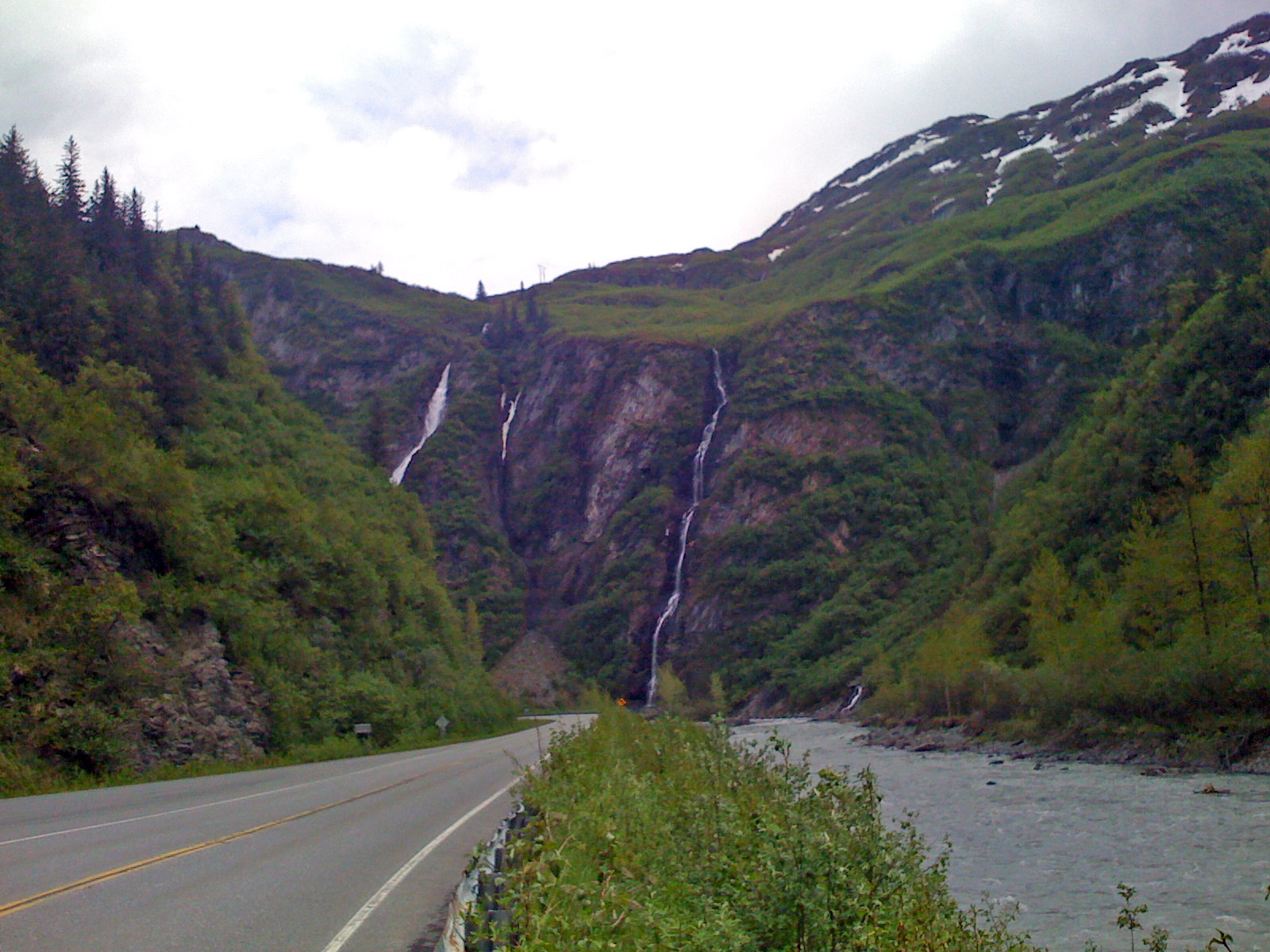
The river running next to the Richardson Highway through Keystone Canyon

The Lowe River is a 28-mile (45 km) long river in Alaska. It begins at glacier known as Deserted Glacier in the Chugach Mountains. The upper river then passes through Heiden Canyon before meeting and paralleling the Richardson Highway. Following this, it enters the narrow and steeply walled Keystone Canyon, which marks the transition between the upper and lower river. The lower river exits the canyon and turns northwest into a broad valley approximately 10 miles in length. It finally flows into the head of Port Valdez, an arm of Prince William Sound near Valdez. It was named by William R. Abercrombie in honor of Lt. Perceval Lowe, a member of an exploratory mission in the area led by Abercrombie.
