= Valdez, Alaska =

Town in Alaska

Valdez, Alaska Suacit
- City
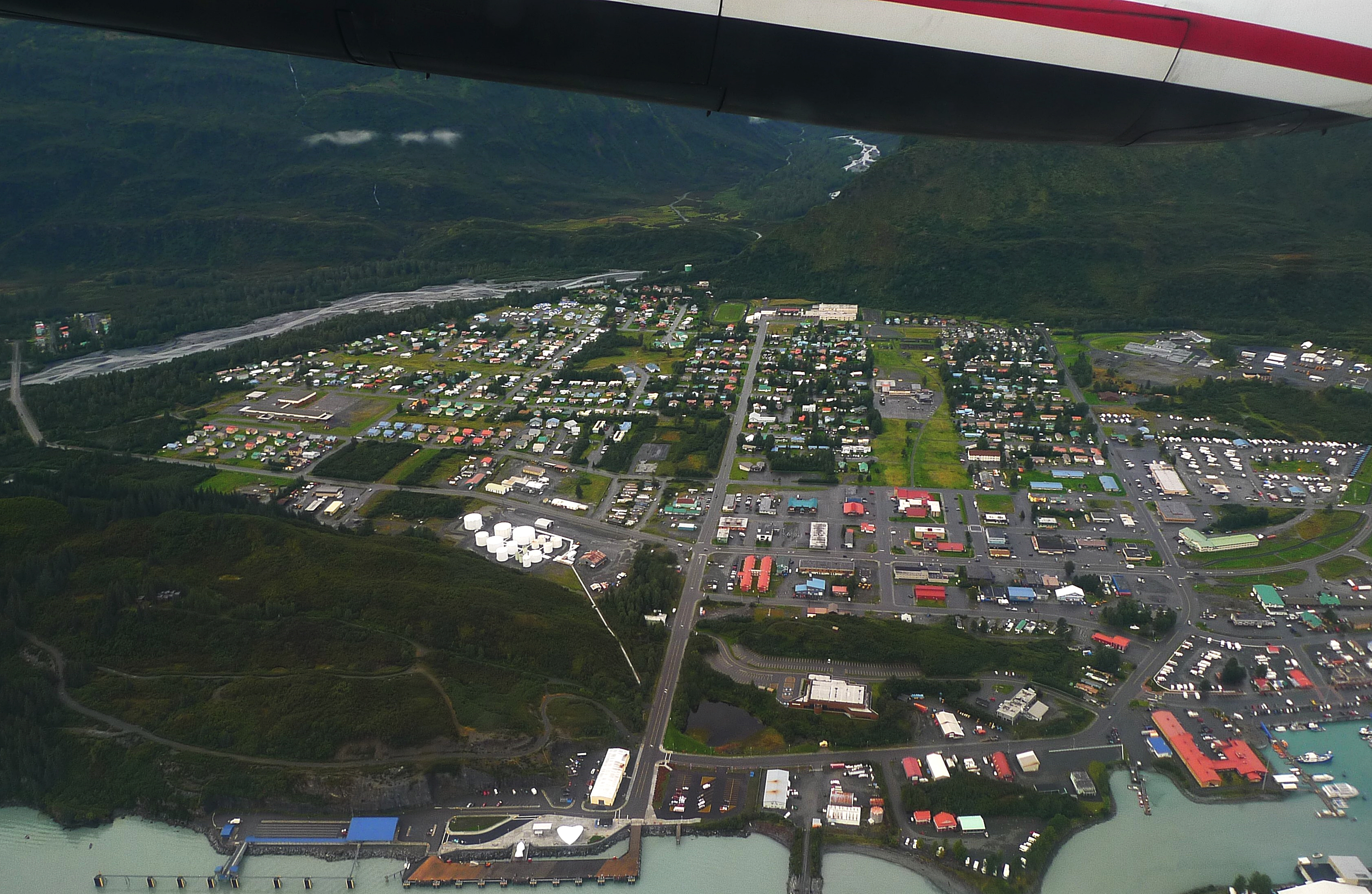
- An aerial view showing the townsite, the harbor, Port Valdez, the lower Mineral Creek valley, and Blueberry Hill

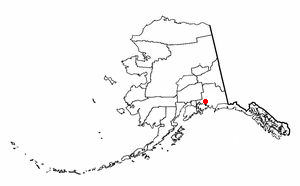
- Location of Valdez, Alaska
- Coordinates: 61°7′51″N 146°20′54″W
- Country: United States
- State: Alaska
- Census Area: Chugach
- Incorporated: June 11, 1901

Government
  - Mayor: Sharon Scheidt
  - State senator: Mike Shower (R)
  - State rep.: George Rauscher (R)

Area
  - Total: 271.91 sq mi (704.24 km^{2})
  - Land: 212.69 sq mi (550.86 km^{2})
  - Water: 59.22 sq mi (153.37 km^{2})
- Elevation: 98 ft (30 m)

Population (2020)
  - Total: 3,985
  - Density: 18.7/sq mi (7.23/km^{2})
- Time zone: UTC−9 (Alaska (AKST))
  - Summer (DST): UTC−8 (AKDT)
- ZIP code: 99686
- Area code: 907
- FIPS code: 02-82200
- GNIS feature ID: 1412465
- Website: valdezak.gov

Valdez (/vælˈdiːz/ val-DEEZ; Alutiiq: Suacit) is a city in the Chugach Census Area (Note: The Chugach Census Area was established in 2019 by the split of the former Valdez–Cordova Census Area.) in the U.S. state of Alaska. In 2020, the population of Valdez was 3,985, up slightly from 3,976 in 2010. It is the third most populated city in Alaska's Unorganized Borough.

Valdez was named in 1790 after the Spanish Navy Minister Antonio Valdés y Fernández Bazán. A former gold rush town, it is located at the head of Port Valdez on the eastern side of Prince William Sound. Valdez was incorporated in 1901, and flourished after the road link to Fairbanks was constructed in 1910. It suffered catastrophic damage during the 1964 Alaska earthquake, and is located near the site of the disastrous 1989 Exxon Valdez oil tanker spill. Today, it is one of the most important ports in Alaska, a commercial fishing port as well as a freight terminal. Valdez is the terminus for the Trans-Alaska Pipeline System.

== History ==
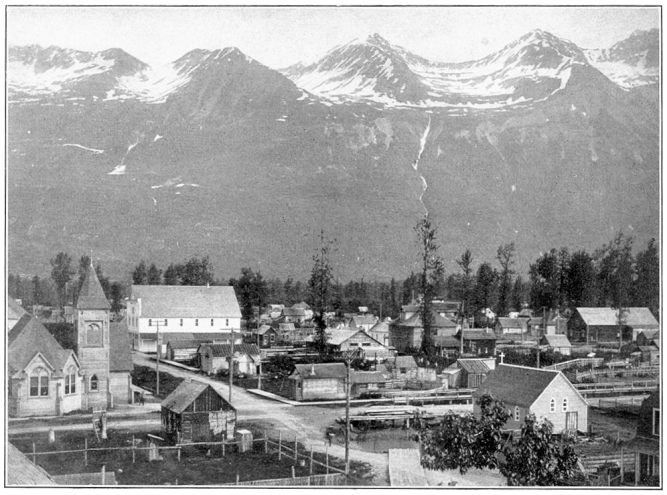
Valdez in 1910

=== Spanish beginnings ===
The port of Valdez was named in 1790 by the Spanish explorer Salvador Fidalgo after the Spanish naval officer Antonio Valdés y Fernández Bazán.

In 1790, within the framework of the expeditions of Spain in the Pacific Northwest, under the direction of Juan Vicente de Güemes, 2nd Count of Revillagigedo, then viceroy of New Spain, Salvador Fidalgo was sent to San Lorenzo de Nootka where they founded the Fort of Saint Michael (Nutka). On May 5, 1790, Fidalgo sailed with the San Carlos de Nutka towards Prince William Sound and Cook Inlet, off the coast of Alaska. A few weeks later, he anchored off present-day Cordova, Alaska. The expedition found no signs of a Russian presence and traded with natives in the area.

On June 3 they disembarked on the coast of present-day Orca Inlet. In a solemn ceremony, Fidalgo erected a large wooden cross and reaffirmed Spanish sovereignty over the territory, naming it "Puerto Córdova." Fidalgo continued along the Alaskan coast, until he reached Point Gravina on June 10, where he celebrated another act of reaffirmation of Spanish sovereignty. On June 15, they discovered a port, which they named Puerto Valdés, in honor of Antonio Valdés y Fernández Bazán, then "Secretary of State of the Universal Office of the Navy and the Indies", a position equivalent to Minister for the affairs of the Spanish Navy and the four Spanish Viceroyalties of the Americas, including the Captaincy General of the Philippines.

In the 1790s Nootka Conventions, which followed the Nootka crisis, Spain granted Great Britain access rights to the Pacific Northwest. It did not establish the boundary with Spanish California, nor did it cede Spanish rights in the area. In 1819, Spain relinquished any remaining claim to territory north of the 42nd parallel to the United States, as part of the Adams–Onís Treaty.

=== Mining town ===
In 1898, a scam to lure prospectors off the Klondike Gold Rush trail led to a town being developed there. Some steamship companies promoted the Valdez Glacier Trail as a better route for miners to reach the Klondike gold fields and discover new ones in the Copper River country of interior Alaska than that from Skagway. The prospectors who believed the promotion found that they had been deceived. The glacier trail was twice as long and steep as reported, and many men died attempting the crossing, in part by contracting scurvy during the long cold winter without adequate supplies.

The town did not flourish until after the construction of the Richardson Highway in 1910, which connected Valdez and Fairbanks. With a new road and its ice-free port, Valdez became permanently established as the first overland supply route into the interior of Alaska. The highway was open in summer-only until 1950, when it started operating as a year-round route.

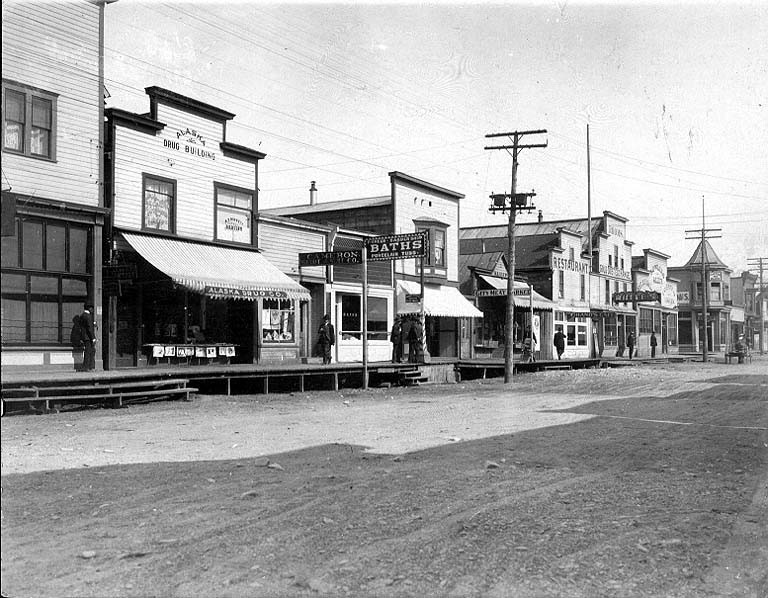
McKinley Avenue in Valdez, June 1908

In 1907, a shootout between two rival railroad companies ended Valdez's hope of becoming the railroad link from tidewater to the Kennicott Copper Mine. The mine, located in the heart of the Wrangell-St. Elias Mountains, was one of the richest copper ore deposits on the continent. The exact location of the right-of-way dispute, in which one man was killed and several injured, is located at the southern entrance of Keystone Canyon on the Valdez side. A half-completed tunnel in the canyon marks the end of railroad days in Valdez. A rail line to Kennicott was later established from the coastal city of Cordova.

=== Good Friday earthquake/Great Alaska Earthquake ===
In 1964, Valdez was badly shaken and damaged by the Good Friday earthquake. Soil liquefaction of the glacial silt that formed Valdez's foundation led to a massive underwater landslide, which caused a section of Valdez's shoreline to break off and sink into the sea. The underwater soil displacement caused a local tsunami 30 feet (9.1 m) high that traveled westward, away from Valdez and down Valdez Bay. 32 men, women, and children were on Valdez's main freight dock to help with and watch the unloading of the SS Chena, a supply ship that came to Valdez regularly. All 32 people died as the dock collapsed into the ocean with the violent landslide. There were no deaths in the town.

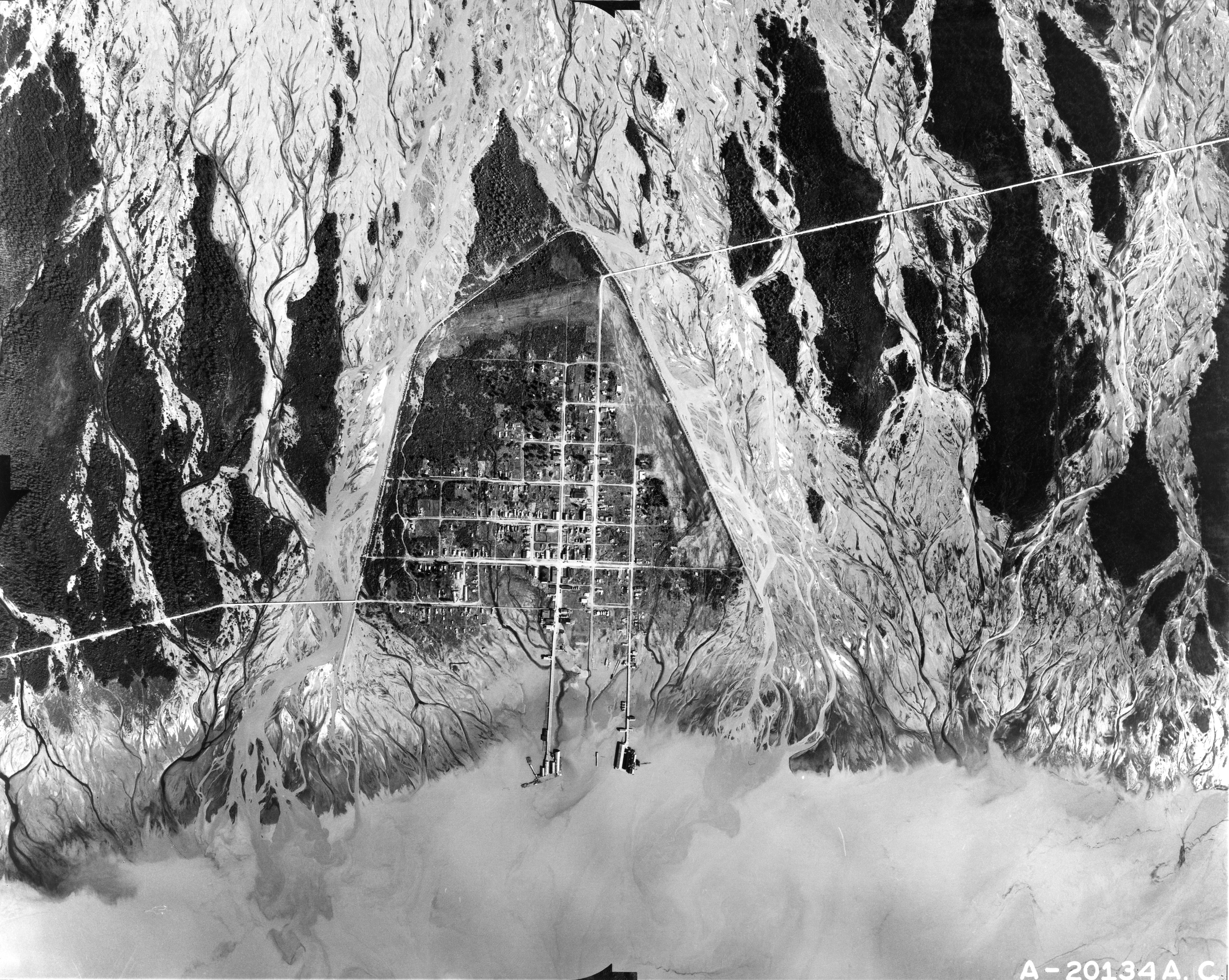
Valdez in the 1940s

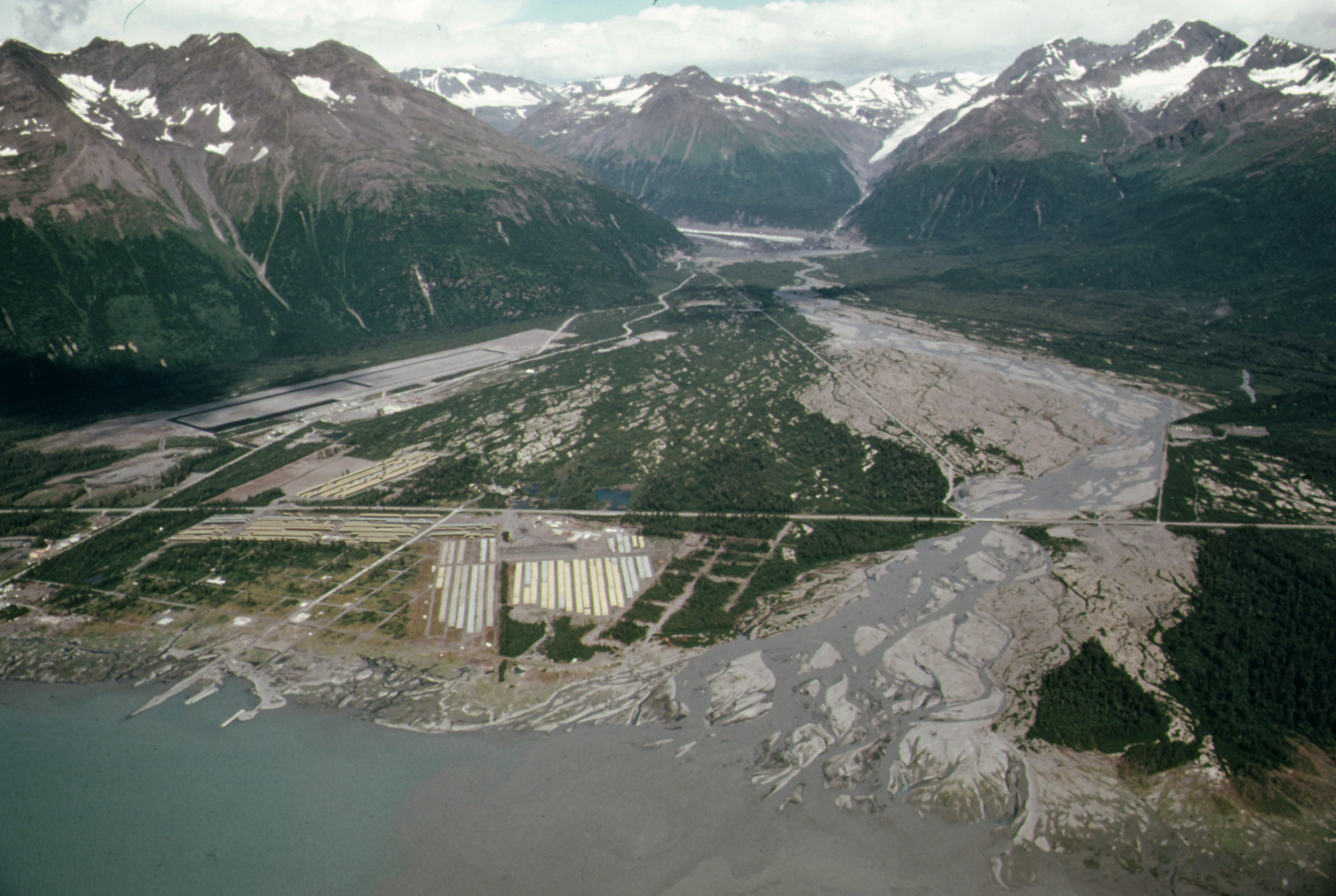
The Valdez townsite was abandoned and relocated following the 1964 earthquake and was used as a pipe yard for the construction of the Trans-Alaska Pipeline System, as shown in this 1974 photo.

Residents continued to live there for an additional three years while a new site was being prepared on more stable ground four miles (6 km) away. The new construction was supervised by the Army Corps of Engineers. They transported 54 houses and buildings by truck to the new site, to re-establish the new city at its present location. The original town site was dismantled, abandoned and eventually burned down.

In the early 1900s, city leaders George Cheever Hazelet and Andrew Jackson Meals dreamed of moving the original site of Valdez to higher, more stable ground. Long after they were gone, their vision was realized. The 1964 earthquake was the defining moment. What is now known as "Old Town" was devastated. The descendants of both men responded by revitalizing the old partnership of 1898. They formed The Port Valdez Company to donate 115 acres of land, where the failed "Hazeletville" development once stood, so the City of Valdez could rebuild and thrive again.

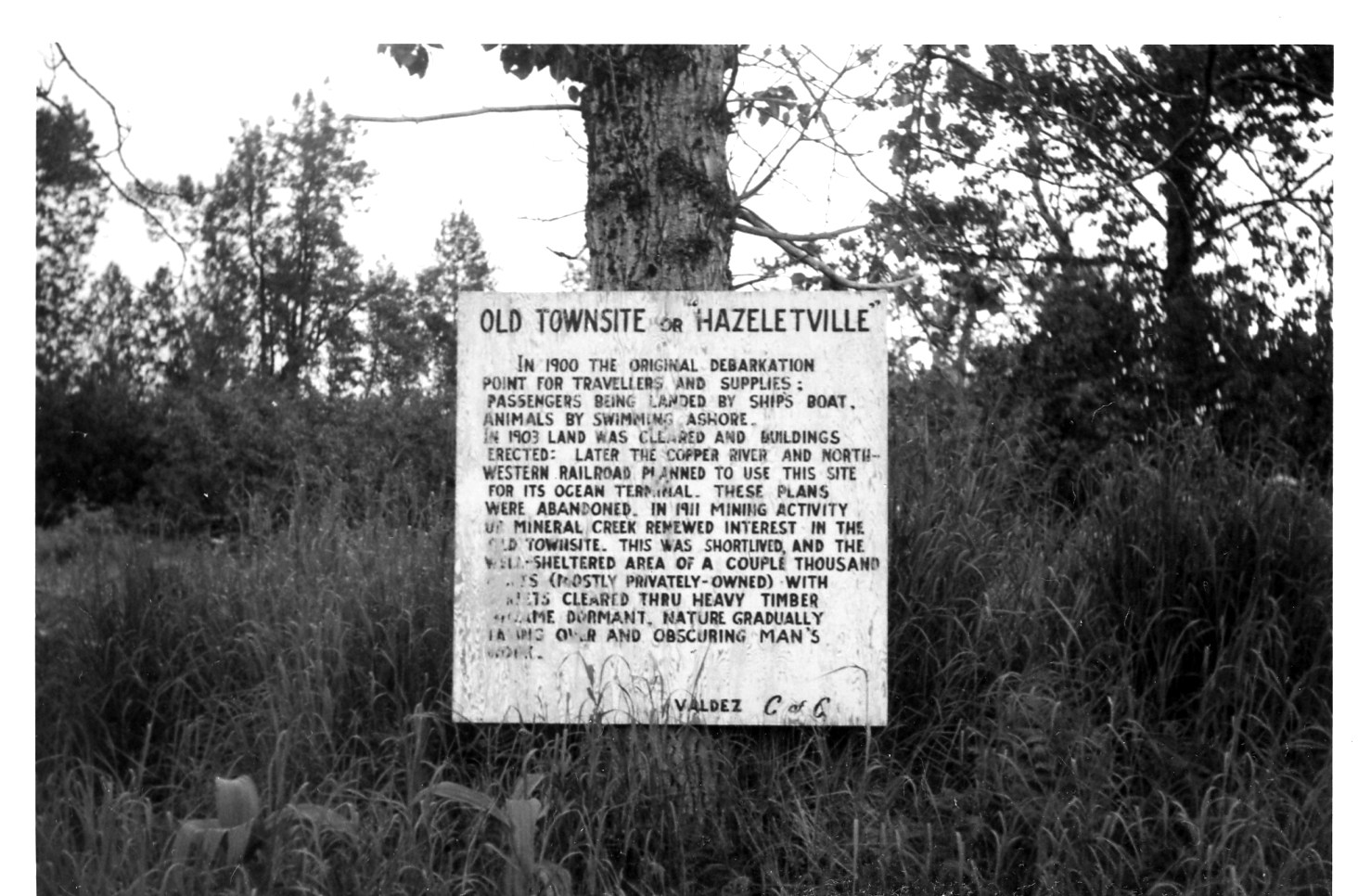
"Hazeletville" Valdez, 1900

=== Trans-Alaska pipeline ===
From 1975 to 1977, the Trans-Alaska pipeline was built to carry oil from the Prudhoe Bay oil fields in northern Alaska to a terminal in Valdez, the nearest ice-free port. Oil is loaded onto tanker ships for transport. The construction and operation of the pipeline and terminal boosted the economy of Valdez. The first tanker to be loaded with pipeline oil was the ARCO Juneau in early August 1977, bound for the Cherry Point Refinery in Washington.

The 1989 Exxon Valdez oil spill occurred as the oil tanker Exxon Valdez was leaving the terminal at Valdez full of oil. The spill occurred at Bligh Reef, about 40 km (25 mi) from Valdez. Although the oil did not reach Valdez, it devastated much of the marine life in the surrounding area. The clean-up of the oil caused a short-term boost to the economy of Valdez.

=== 2014 avalanches ===
On January 24, 2014, a major avalanche occurred just outside Valdez at Mile 16 near Keystone Canyon, prompting the closure of the only highway in or out of town. On January 25, Alaska DOT triggered another massive slide that further choked the roadway. Due to weather conditions at the time, the avalanche dammed the Lowe River, creating a half-mile-long lake that stalled snow removal efforts for nearly a week. The blockage was dubbed the "Damalanche" by local city officials after a name coined by local resident, Joshua Buffington. News of this event spread to media outlets nationwide. Once the water receded, crews worked around the clock to clear about 200,000 cubic yards of snow in five days. No one was injured during this incident.

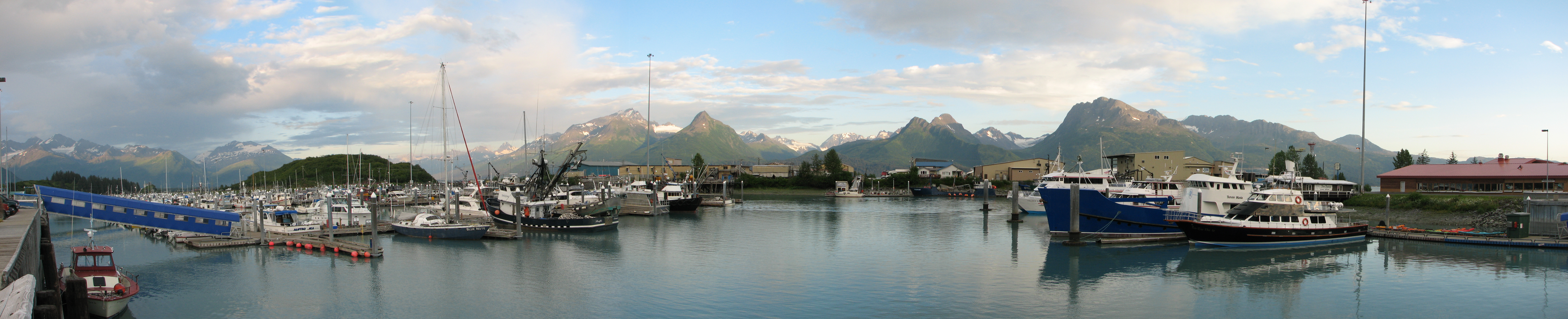
The port of Valdez, set against a natural backdrop of mountains in July 2007. Also visible are the shipping terminal for the Trans-Alaska Pipeline and Mt. Francis.

== Geography ==
Climate chart for Valdez

Valdez is located at 61°7′51″N 146°20′54″W. According to the United States Census Bureau, Valdez has a total area of 277.1 square miles (718 km^{2}), of which 222.0 square miles (575 km^{2}) is land. 55.1 square miles (143 km^{2}), comprising 19.88%, is water.

Valdez is located near the head of a deep fjord in the Prince William Sound in Alaska. It is surrounded by the Chugach Mountains, which are heavily glaciated. Nearby Shoup Glacier, which feeds Shoup Bay, served as a source of ice for residents of the town at the turn of the 20th century.

Valdez is the northernmost port in North America that is ice-free year-round. The northernmost point of the coastal Pacific temperate rain forest is in Valdez, on Blueberry Hill. The only road access is via the Richardson Highway, which traverses Thompson Pass and Keystone Canyon to end at Valdez.

=== Climate ===
Despite the presence of temperate rainforest, Valdez under the Köppen climate classification has a subarctic climate (Dfc): its winters, though much warmer than most climates of this type, are not sufficiently mild, as those of, say, Ketchikan, Kodiak, or even nearby Cordova are, to fit into the oceanic or subpolar oceanic climate category.

According to the Weather Channel and NOAA, Valdez is the snowiest city in the United States, with an average of over 300 in (760 cm) per year. There have been more than 100 in (250 cm) of snow in five separate months (not all in the same year).

Climate data for Valdez, Alaska (1991–2020 normals, (Note: Mean monthly maxima and minima (i.e. the highest and lowest temperature readings during an entire month or year) calculated based on data at said location from 1991 to 2020.) extremes 1917–present (Note: Records for Valdez have been kept at the Valdez Weather Station (GHCN ID "USC00509687") since March 16, 2014, and at Valdez Airport (GHCN ID "USW00026442") from May 1, 1917, to March 15, 2014.))
Month	Jan	Feb	Mar	Apr	May	Jun	Jul	Aug	Sep	Oct	Nov	Dec	Year
Record high °F (°C)	55 (13)	59 (15)	57 (14)	69 (21)	79 (26)	90 (32)	85 (29)	84 (29)	75 (24)	69 (21)	59 (15)	54 (12)	90 (32)
Mean maximum °F (°C)	40.1 (4.5)	41.2 (5.1)	46.6 (8.1)	57.1 (13.9)	68.4 (20.2)	75.1 (23.9)	76.3 (24.6)	74.8 (23.8)	65.7 (18.7)	55.0 (12.8)	43.6 (6.4)	41.0 (5.0)	78.9 (26.1)
Mean daily maximum °F (°C)	28.7 (−1.8)	31.9 (−0.1)	36.7 (2.6)	46.4 (8.0)	55.6 (13.1)	62.5 (16.9)	64.1 (17.8)	62.0 (16.7)	55.0 (12.8)	44.9 (7.2)	33.9 (1.1)	30.7 (−0.7)	46.0 (7.8)
Daily mean °F (°C)	23.9 (−4.5)	26.7 (−2.9)	29.9 (−1.2)	39.2 (4.0)	47.7 (8.7)	54.4 (12.4)	56.6 (13.7)	54.5 (12.5)	48.3 (9.1)	39.5 (4.2)	29.4 (−1.4)	26.2 (−3.2)	39.7 (4.3)
Mean daily minimum °F (°C)	19.1 (−7.2)	21.4 (−5.9)	23.0 (−5.0)	31.9 (−0.1)	39.8 (4.3)	46.3 (7.9)	49.1 (9.5)	46.9 (8.3)	41.6 (5.3)	34.1 (1.2)	24.9 (−3.9)	21.8 (−5.7)	33.3 (0.7)
Mean minimum °F (°C)	2.8 (−16.2)	6.9 (−13.9)	10.0 (−12.2)	20.8 (−6.2)	31.9 (−0.1)	39.2 (4.0)	43.9 (6.6)	40.3 (4.6)	31.6 (−0.2)	23.0 (−5.0)	12.4 (−10.9)	7.2 (−13.8)	−0.5 (−18.1)
Record low °F (°C)	−24 (−31)	−28 (−33)	−11 (−24)	0 (−18)	13 (−11)	27 (−3)	33 (1)	29 (−2)	14 (−10)	5 (−15)	−10 (−23)	−18 (−28)	−28 (−33)
Average precipitation inches (mm)	6.56 (167)	5.92 (150)	4.10 (104)	3.37 (86)	3.02 (77)	2.44 (62)	3.87 (98)	7.00 (178)	9.76 (248)	7.98 (203)	6.14 (156)	7.74 (197)	67.90 (1,725)
Average snowfall inches (cm)	66.6 (169)	63.4 (161)	45.8 (116)	22.3 (57)	3.4 (8.6)	0.0 (0.0)	0.0 (0.0)	0.0 (0.0)	0.7 (1.8)	9.1 (23)	43.5 (110)	70.5 (179)	325.3 (826)
Average precipitation days (≥ 0.01 in)	16.3	15.3	13.9	14.3	15.0	13.8	18.0	18.4	20.9	19.3	15.5	17.3	198.0
Average snowy days (≥ 0.1 in)	15.6	14.3	13.0	6.2	1.4	0.0	0.0	0.0	0.3	4.7	12.9	16.0	84.4
Average relative humidity (%)	77.6	72.7	72.9	72.5	75.2	78.5	83.0	84.9	84.2	78.5	74.0	77.1	77.6
Average dew point °F (°C)	18.1 (−7.7)	16.5 (−8.6)	22.5 (−5.3)	28.2 (−2.1)	37.6 (3.1)	44.4 (6.9)	48.9 (9.4)	47.8 (8.8)	41.7 (5.4)	31.5 (−0.3)	19.8 (−6.8)	18.1 (−7.7)	31.3 (−0.4)
Source: NOAA

See or edit raw graph data.

== Demographics ==
Historical population
Census	Pop.	Note	%±
1900	315		—
1910	810		157.1%
1920	466		−42.5%
1930	442		−5.2%
1940	529		19.7%
1950	554		4.7%
1960	555		0.2%
1970	1,005		81.1%
1980	3,079		206.4%
1990	4,068		32.1%
2000	4,036		−0.8%
2010	3,976		−1.5%
2020	3,985		0.2%
U.S. Decennial Census

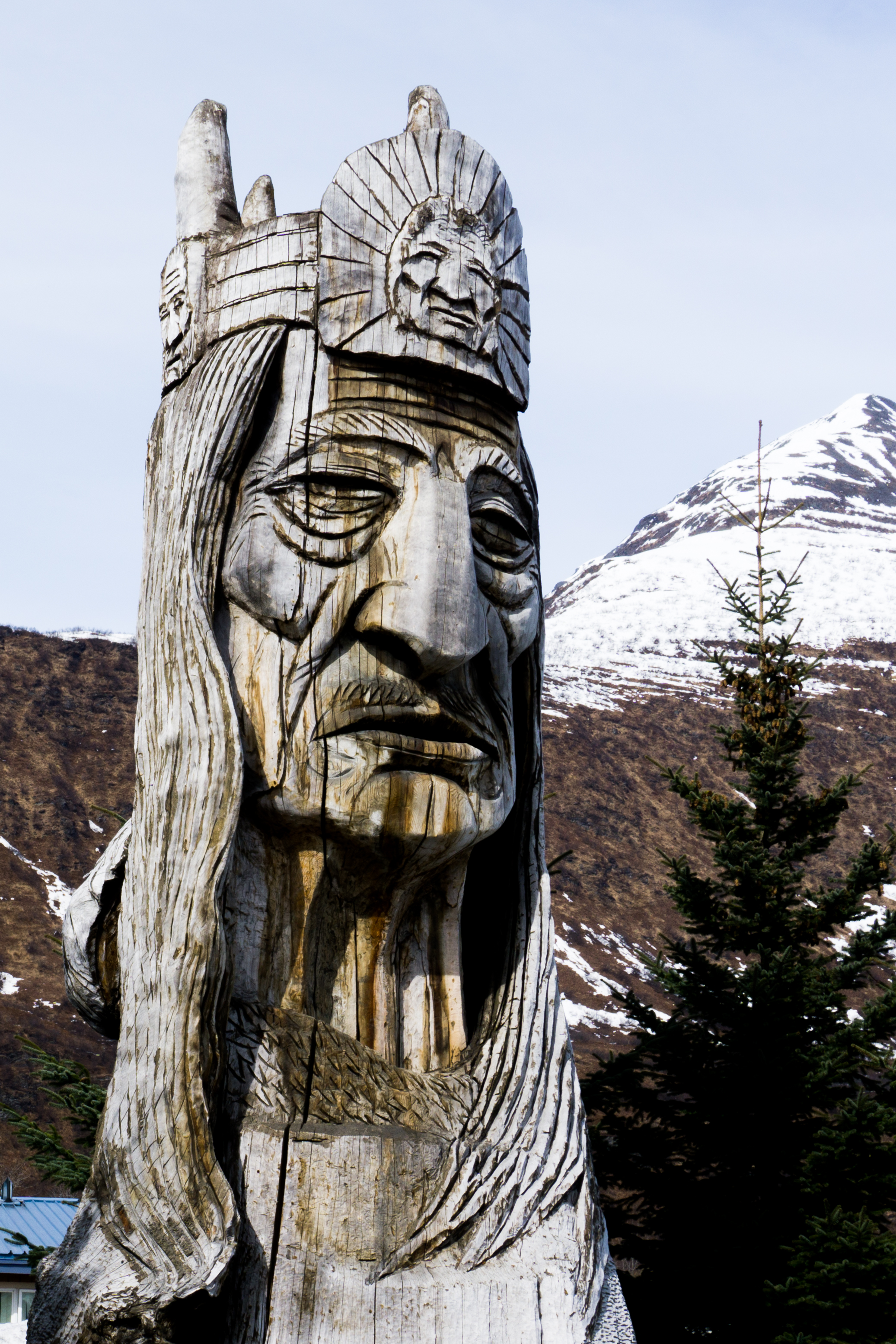
A totem in Valdez honoring the Native American population

Valdez first appeared on the 1900 U.S. Census as the unincorporated village of "Valdes." It formally incorporated as Valdez in 1901, and has reported in every successive census. The original townsite was relocated in 1967 from the east side to the north side of Port Valdez after the 1964 Good Friday Earthquake, but still lays within the present city limits.

=== 2020 census ===
As of the 2020 census, Valdez had a population of 3,985. The median age was 36.6 years. 24.3% of residents were under the age of 18 and 10.0% of residents were 65 years of age or older. For every 100 females there were 112.2 males, and for every 100 females age 18 and over there were 112.8 males age 18 and over.

0.0% of residents lived in urban areas, while 100.0% lived in rural areas.

There were 1,550 households in Valdez, of which 31.5% had children under the age of 18 living in them. Of all households, 47.3% were married-couple households, 24.4% were households with a male householder and no spouse or partner present, and 19.3% were households with a female householder and no spouse or partner present. About 29.0% of all households were made up of individuals and 7.7% had someone living alone who was 65 years of age or older.

There were 1,758 housing units, of which 11.8% were vacant. The homeowner vacancy rate was 1.3% and the rental vacancy rate was 9.8%.

Racial composition as of the 2020 census
Race	Number	Percent
White	3,015	75.7%
Black or African American	33	0.8%
American Indian and Alaska Native	309	7.8%
Asian	103	2.6%
Native Hawaiian and Other Pacific Islander	31	0.8%
Some other race	82	2.1%
Two or more races	412	10.3%
Hispanic or Latino (of any race)	269	6.8%

=== 2010 census ===
In the 2010 census, there were 3,976 people. The racial makeup was 78.6% White, 0.6% Black, 7.6% Native American or Alaska Native, 1.9% Asian, 0.8% Pacific Islander and 5.8% from two or more races. 4.7% were Hispanic or Latino of any race.

== Economy ==
Valdez is a fishing port, both for commercial and sport fishing. Freight moves through Valdez bound for the interior of Alaska. Sightseeing of the marine life and glaciers, together with both deep-sea fishing, and heli skiing support a tourist industry in Valdez. The oil from the Trans-Alaska pipeline is loaded onto ships at the Valdez oil terminal.

Alyeska Pipeline Service Company is one of the biggest employers in Valdez.

Valdez is connected to the interior of Alaska by the Richardson Highway, and is a port of call in the Alaska Marine Highway ferry system. Just north of Valdez on the highway is Thompson Pass, which has spectacular waterfalls and glaciers next to the highway. Thompson Pass is known for treacherous driving conditions during the winter.

Valdez hosted the World Extreme Skiing Championship (WESC) in the early 1990s.

== Media and culture ==
Despite its small size, Valdez was at one time home to two weekly newspapers, the Valdez Star and the Valdez Vanguard. In 2004, the Star bought out the Vanguard.

Valdez is home to radio broadcasters KCHU, KVAK, and KVAK-FM.

Valdez is home to the Last Frontier Theatre Conference, hosted by the Prince William Sound College. The annual conference attracts playwrights and actors from around the United States.

On Deadly Ground (1994) was filmed near Worthington Glacier, as well as the Valdez Civic Center and Valdez Airport, and 30 miles (48 km) outside Valdez on Thompson Pass in the Chugach Mountains.

== Oil terminal ==
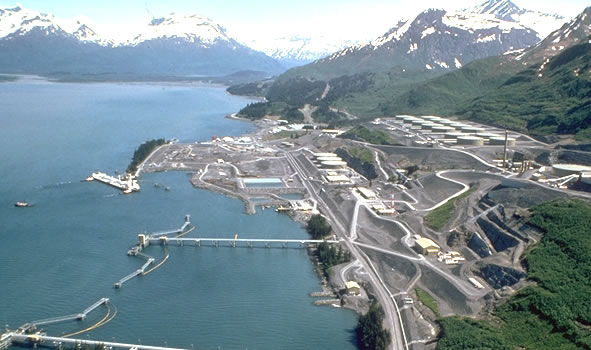
An aerial view of the oil terminal

The Valdez Marine Terminal is an oil port in Valdez, at the southern end of the Alaska Pipeline. The terminal was the point of departure for the Exxon Valdez just prior to the oil spill.

There are 13 active aboveground crude oil storage tanks at the terminal, and an average of three to five oil tankers depart from the terminal each week. Since the pipeline became operational in 1976, more than 19,000 tankers full of oil have left the terminal.

The terminal has 2 operational loading berths.

== Notable people ==
- Neva Egan (1914–2011), first First Lady of Alaska (1959–1966, 1970–1974).
- William A. Egan (1914–1984), first Governor of Alaska (1959–1966, 1970–1974)
- Margaret Keenan Harrais (1872–1964), United States Commissioner at Valdez, and after Alaska became a state, she became a deputy magistrate at Valdez
- Robert Campbell Reeve (1902–1980), Valdez-based bush pilot and founder of Reeve Aleutian Airways
- Bill Walker (born 1951), former Governor of Alaska
- Ed Walker (1917–2011), second-to-last surviving member of Castner's Cutthroats, former member of the Valdez city council.

== See also ==
- Tanerliq
- Valdez Blockade
- Valdez High School
- Valdez Airport
