= Atigun =

The word Atigun can refer to one of several place names in Alaska.

- Atigun Gorge a valley east of Galbraith Lake
- Atigun Pass, a high mountain pass across the Brooks Range
- Atigun River, a river in the Endicott Mountains
