= Dennis Cowals =

American photographer (1945–2004)

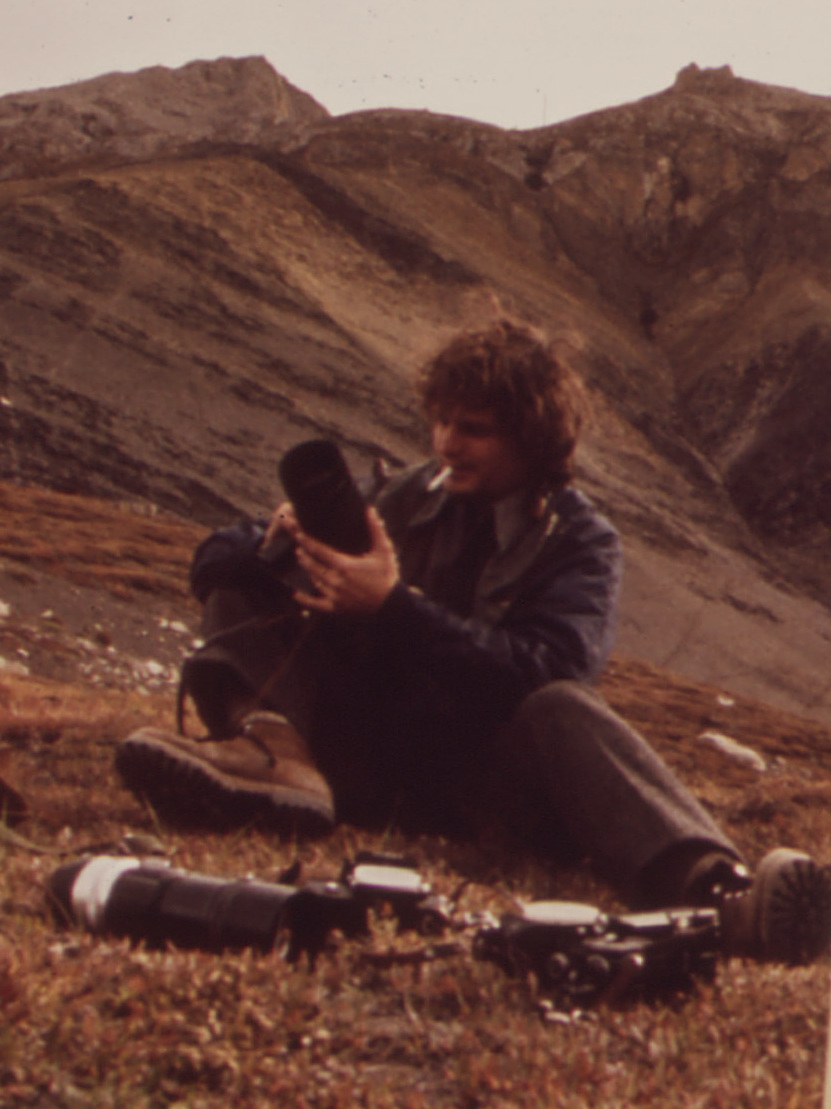
Cowals, 1973

Dennis A. Cowals (12 May 1945 – 22 October 2004) was an American photojournalist and publisher who contributed many photos to the United States Environmental Protection Agency sponsored DOCUMERICA project.

== Early career ==
Cowals graduated from the Medill School of Journalism with a degree in journalism, and went on to attended the University of Alaska for his post-graduate studies in 1967. He worked as a photographer and news editor at the university starting in 1968. He became press secretary for congressman Don Young in 1971.

Environmental Protection Agency sponsored DOCUMERICA project began in the early 1970s. Cowals was hired to photograph the Alaskan landscape before and during the construction of the Trans-Alaska Pipeline System. Hundreds of photos he took during this time period have since been published. He focused on both ground and aerial photos of geography, flora, and fauna. They are now in the public domain.

== Later life ==
Cowals was part of the Mount McKinley hang-gliding expedition on June 2, 1976. He was part of a support crew that saw four pilots launch from the top of the mountain. He wrote about the experience in a 1976 article for Mariah. In 1980, he launched a search for the Kad'yak. He later worked as an author and rescue guide.

Cowals died on 22 October 2004 of lung cancer. He was survived by his son, Dawson.

== Publications ==
Cowals was the editor and publisher of Alaska Fieldbooks.

- Cowals, Dennis "The Expedition that Fell from the Sky," Mariah (Winter 1976), pp. 41 ff.
- Cowals, Dennis (1981). Mount McKinley Climber's Guide. Seattle, Washington: The Mountaineers. ISBN 0-89886-020-2.
- Cowals, Dennis; Decker, Dave; Wright, Frederick (1986). Alaska Wilderness Companion. Anchorage, Alaska: Alaska Fieldbooks.

== Gallery ==
Select DOCUMERICA photos taken by Cowals
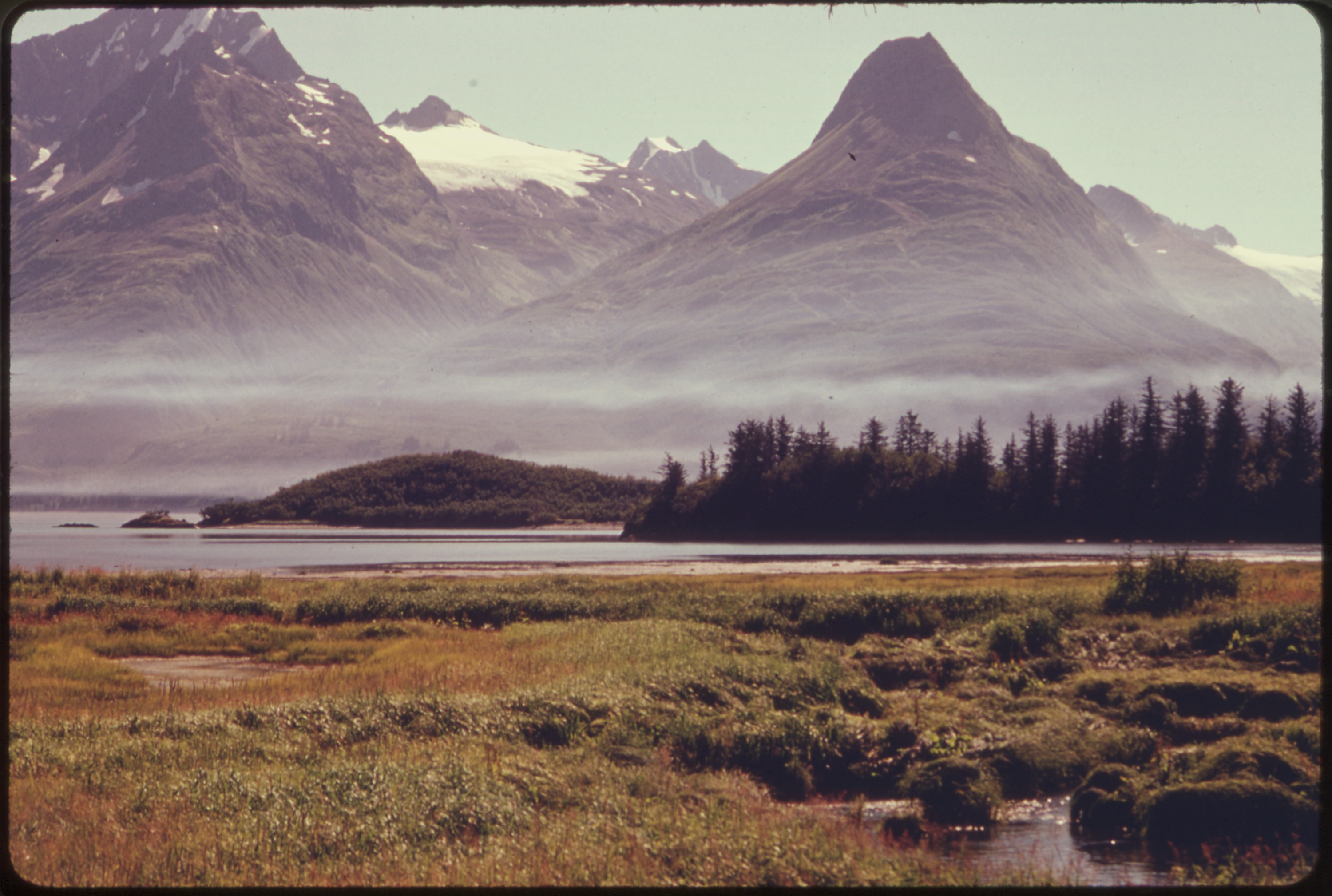
Salt marsh near Valdez, Alaska

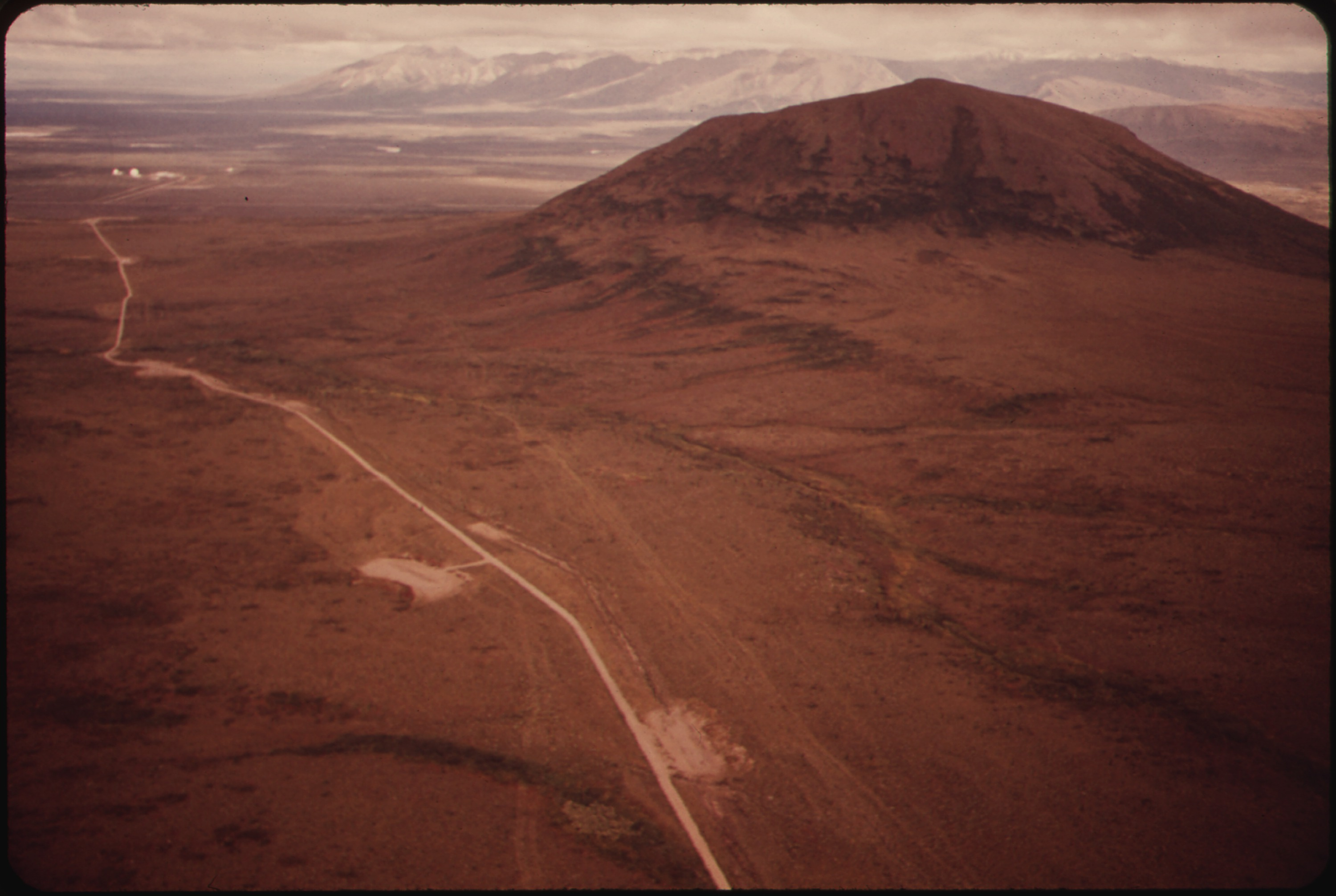
View of Donnelly Dome

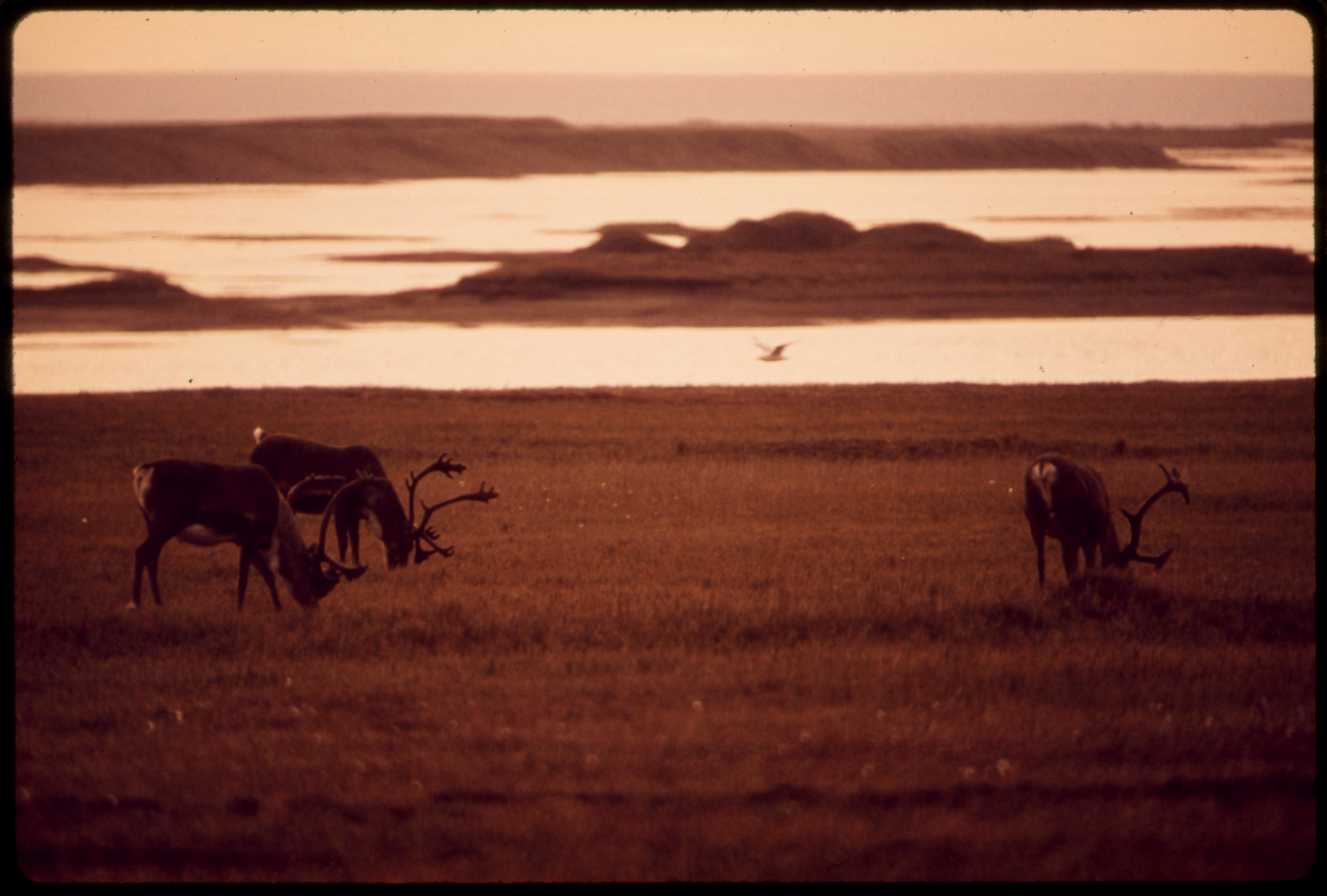
Wild caribou grazing near the Sagavanirktok River

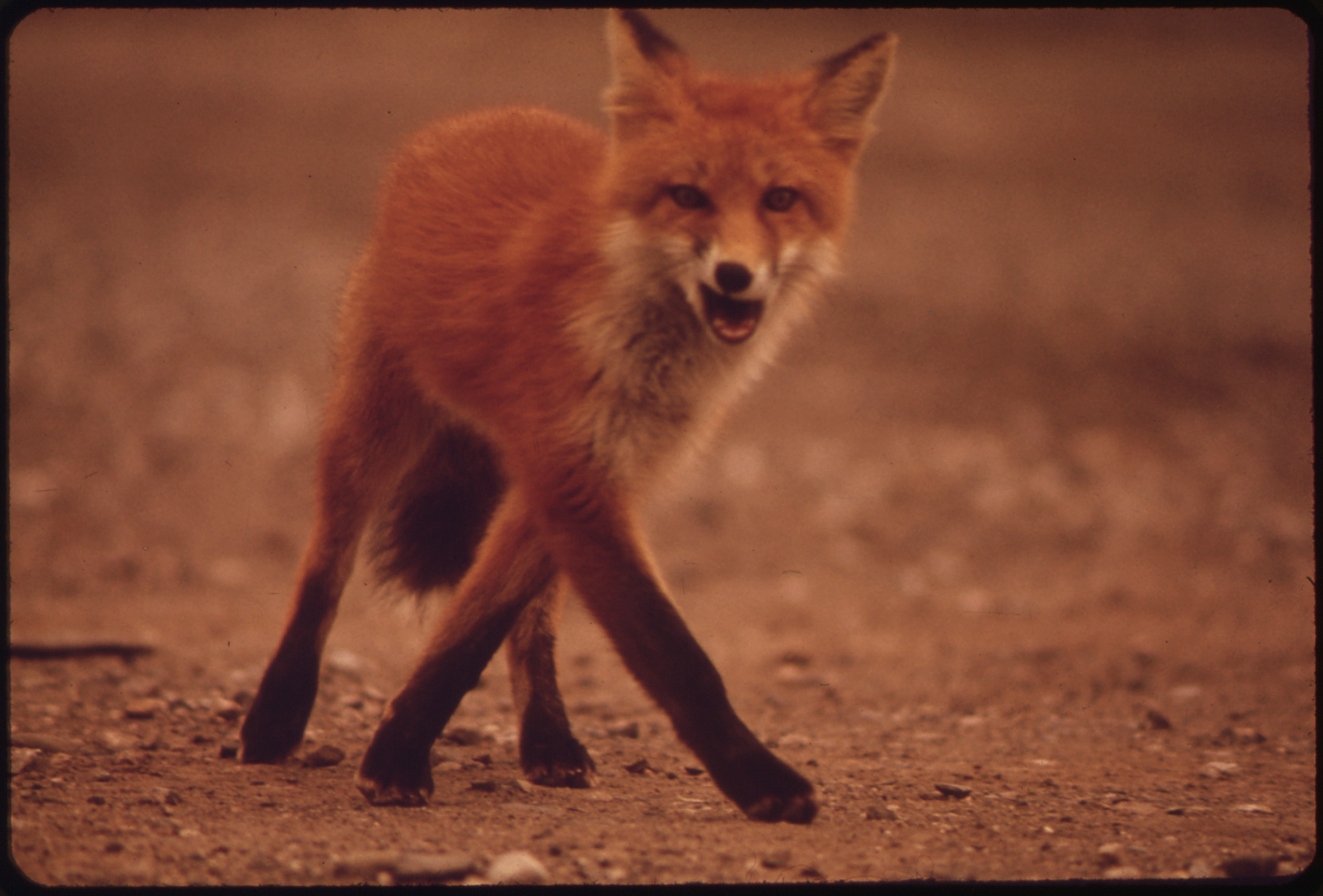
Young female fox near Galbraith Lake

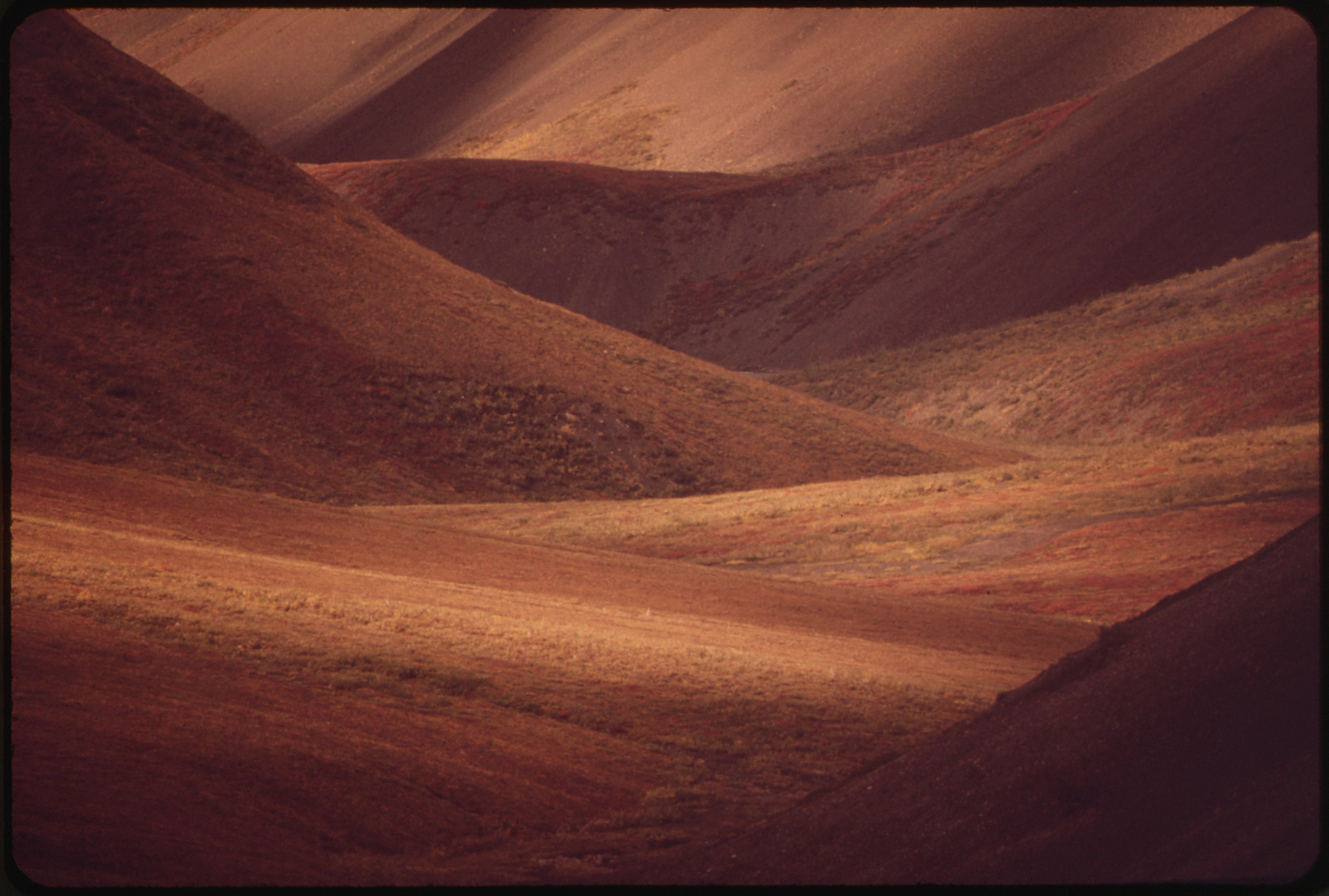
Autumn colors in Atigun Gorge

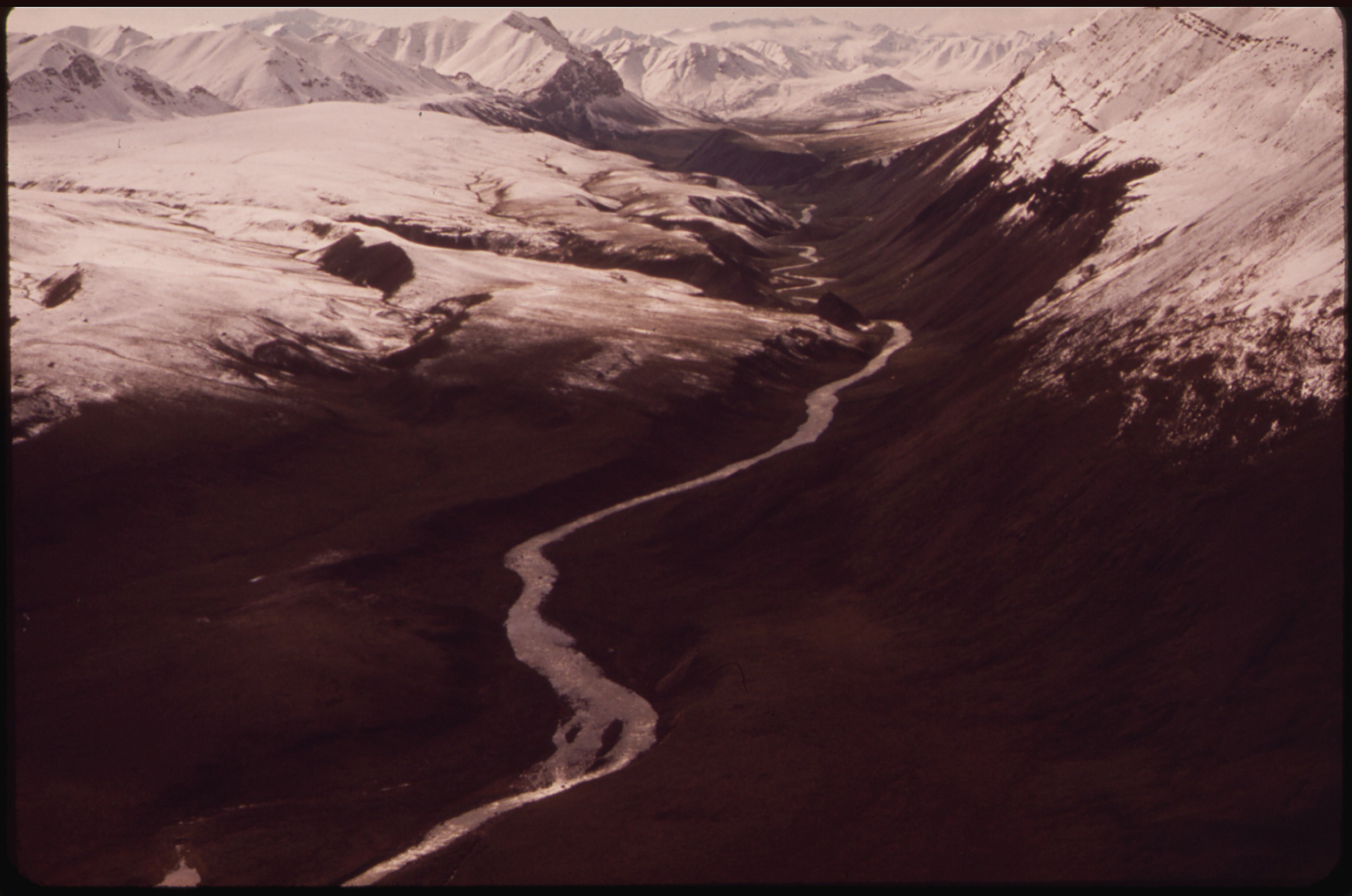
Eastern end of the Atigun River
