= Documerica =

US documentary photography project

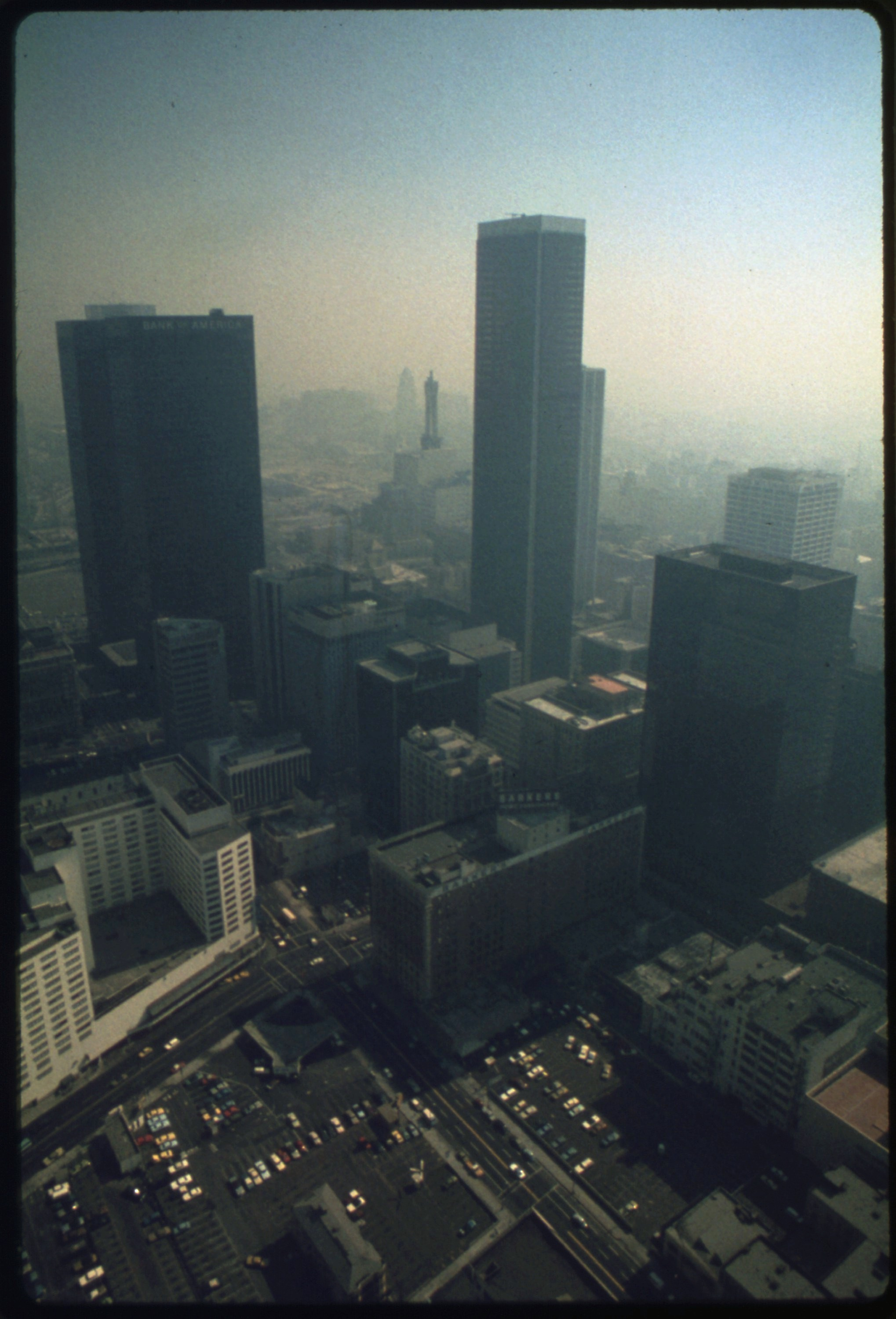
Heavy smog in Los Angeles, 1973, Gene Daniels

Documerica (portmanteau of "document" and "America"; stylized as DOCUMERICA) was a program sponsored by the United States Environmental Protection Agency to "photographically document subjects of environmental concern" in the United States from about 1972 to 1977. The collection, now at the National Archives, contains over 22,000 photographs, more than 15,000 of which are available online.

== Scope ==
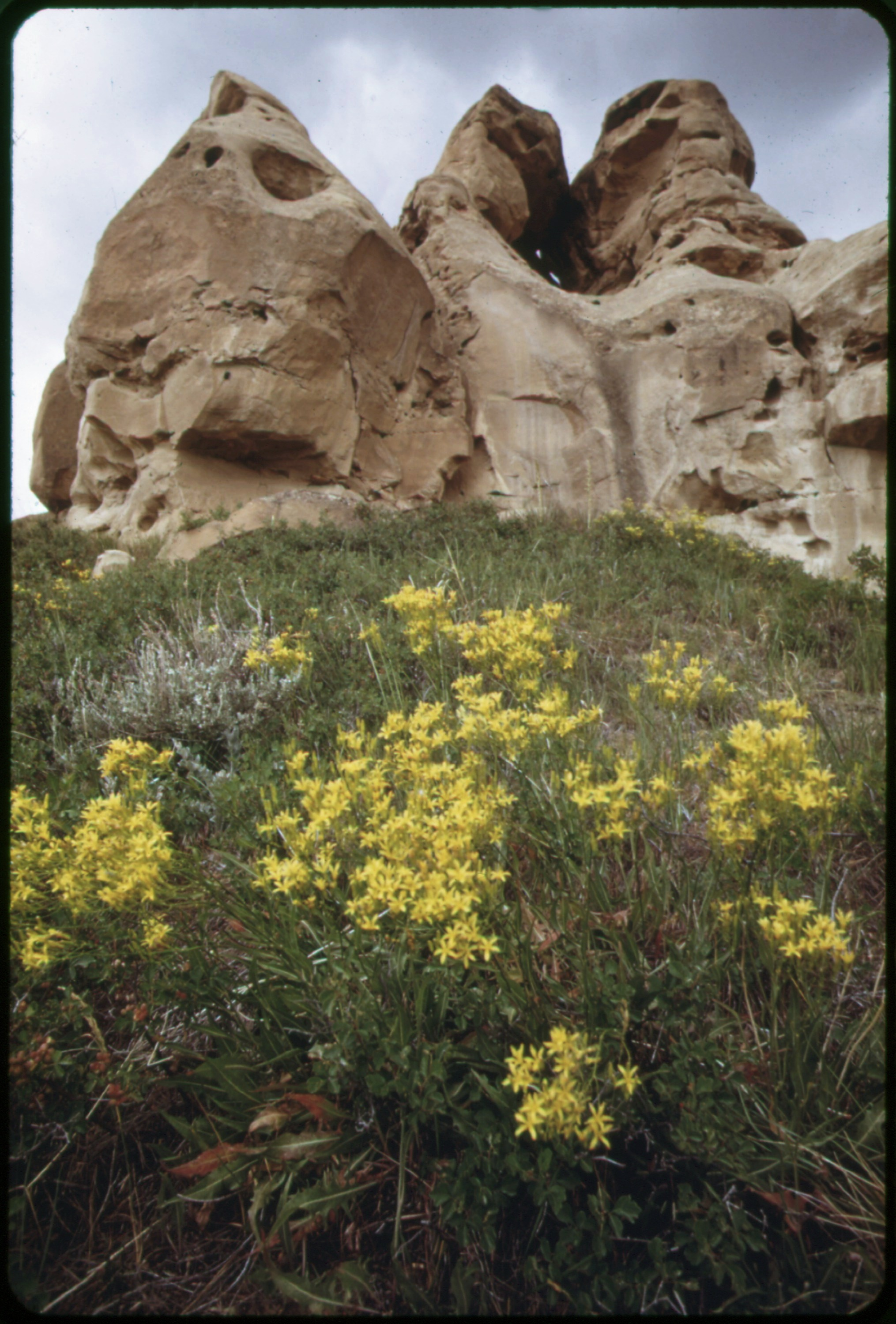
Flowers and rock formations in Sarpy Basin, 1973, Boyd Norton

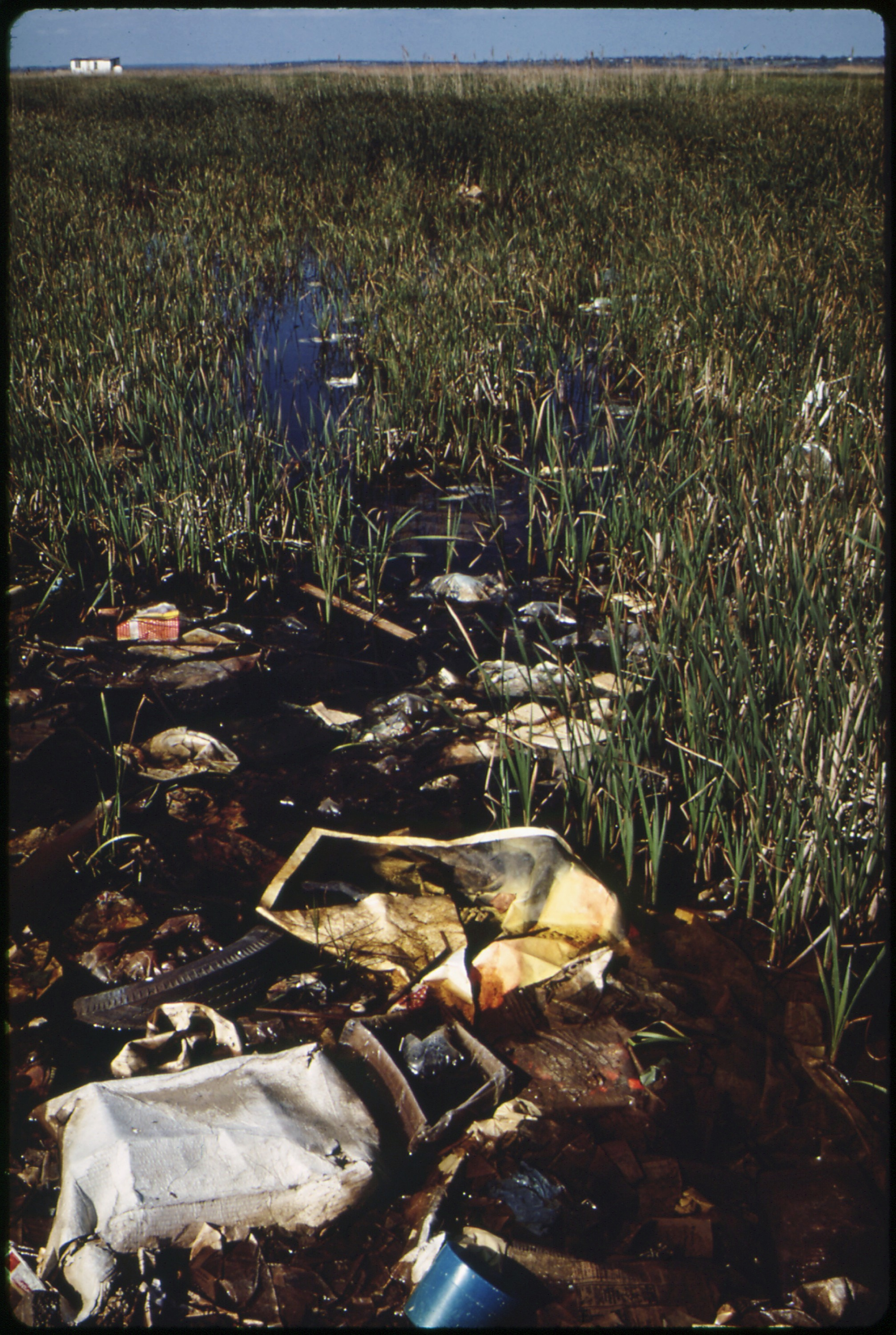
Middletown dump meets the salt marsh, 1973, Hope Alexander

With support from the first EPA administrator, William Ruckelshaus, project director Gifford D. Hampshire contracted well-known photographers to work for the EPA on the project. Estimates of the number involved range between 70 and 120, including Erik Calonius, Dennis Cowals, Gene Daniels, Ken Hayman, Anne LaBastille, Danny Lyon, Boyd Norton, Yoichi Okamoto, Charles O'Rear, Marc St. Gil, Flip Schulke, Tomas Sennett, Bill Strode, Suzanne Szasz, Arthur Tress and John H. White. They were organized geographically, with each photographer working in a particular area in which they were already active. For example, Michael Philip Manheim worked in Boston; Jack Corn focused on West Virginia and Tennessee; Bill Gillette documented miners in Colorado; and Marc St. Gil focused primarily on Leakey, Houston and San Antonio, Texas.

Subjects photographed include urban cityscapes, small towns, rural areas, beaches and mountains. They show people going about their everyday lives as well as working in farms; waterfronts; mining and logging, industry and heavy industry. Images document junk yards, highways, Amtrak trains, air and water pollution; and environmental protection and pollution control measures. The earliest assignments were closely aligned to the EPA's proposed areas of concern: air and water pollution, management of solid waste, radiation and pesticides, and noise abatement. However, photographers had considerable creative freedom about what they shot.As has been discussed by Gisela Parak, photographers working with Documerica were involved in the creation of a new pictorial language to articulate environmental issues. Among the areas depicted are national parks and forests, including environmentally sensitive areas that were under development or considered for government protection, such as the planned route of the Alaska Pipeline, Hawaii and Washington, D.C. Photographers used differing approaches: Boyd Norton's photographs often emphasize the natural beauty of an area, while Alexander Hope's photographs of the Middletown, Rhode Island dump and salt marsh reveal complex inter-relationships of man and nature.

== Details ==
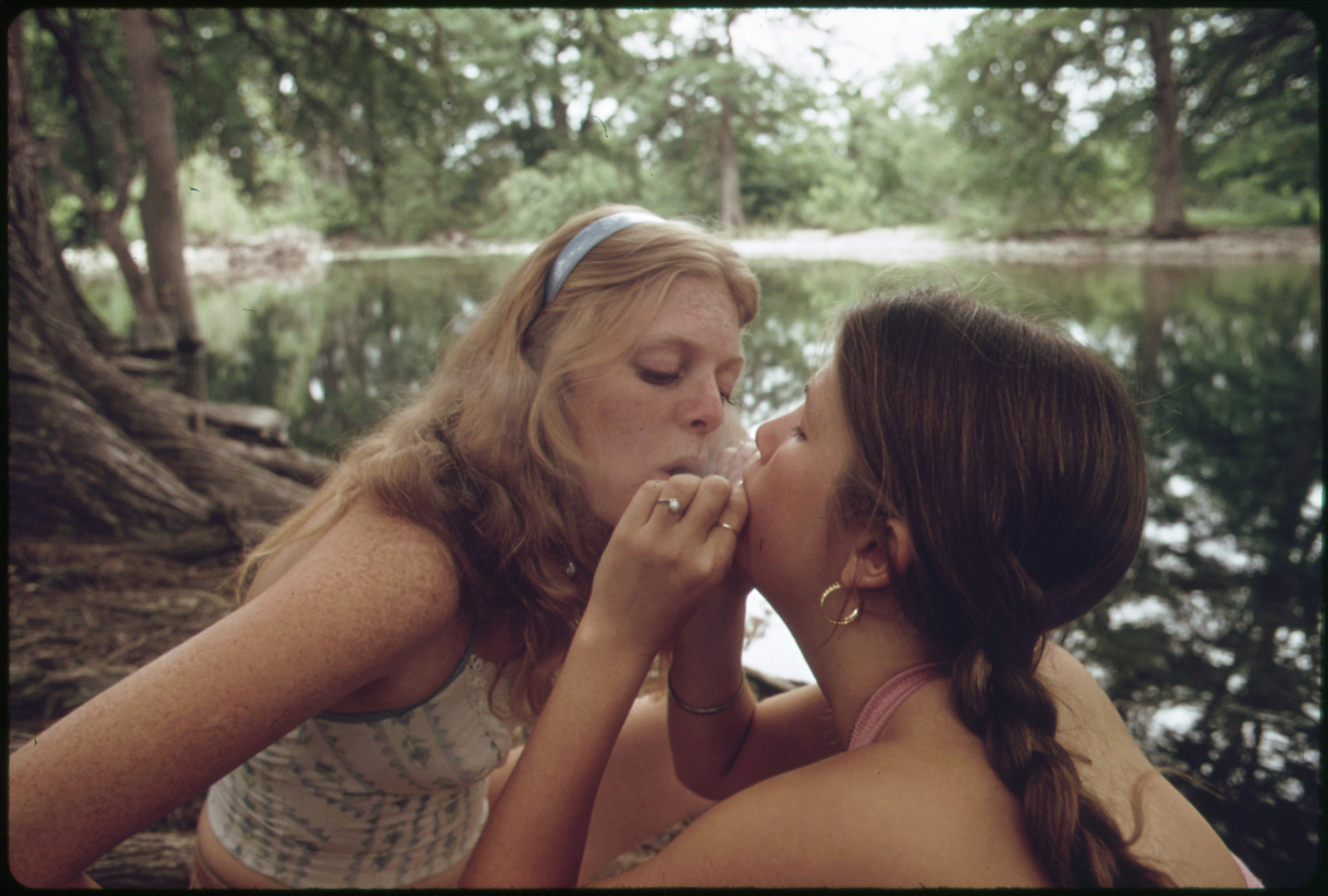
Women smoking pot, Texas, 1973, Marc St. Gil

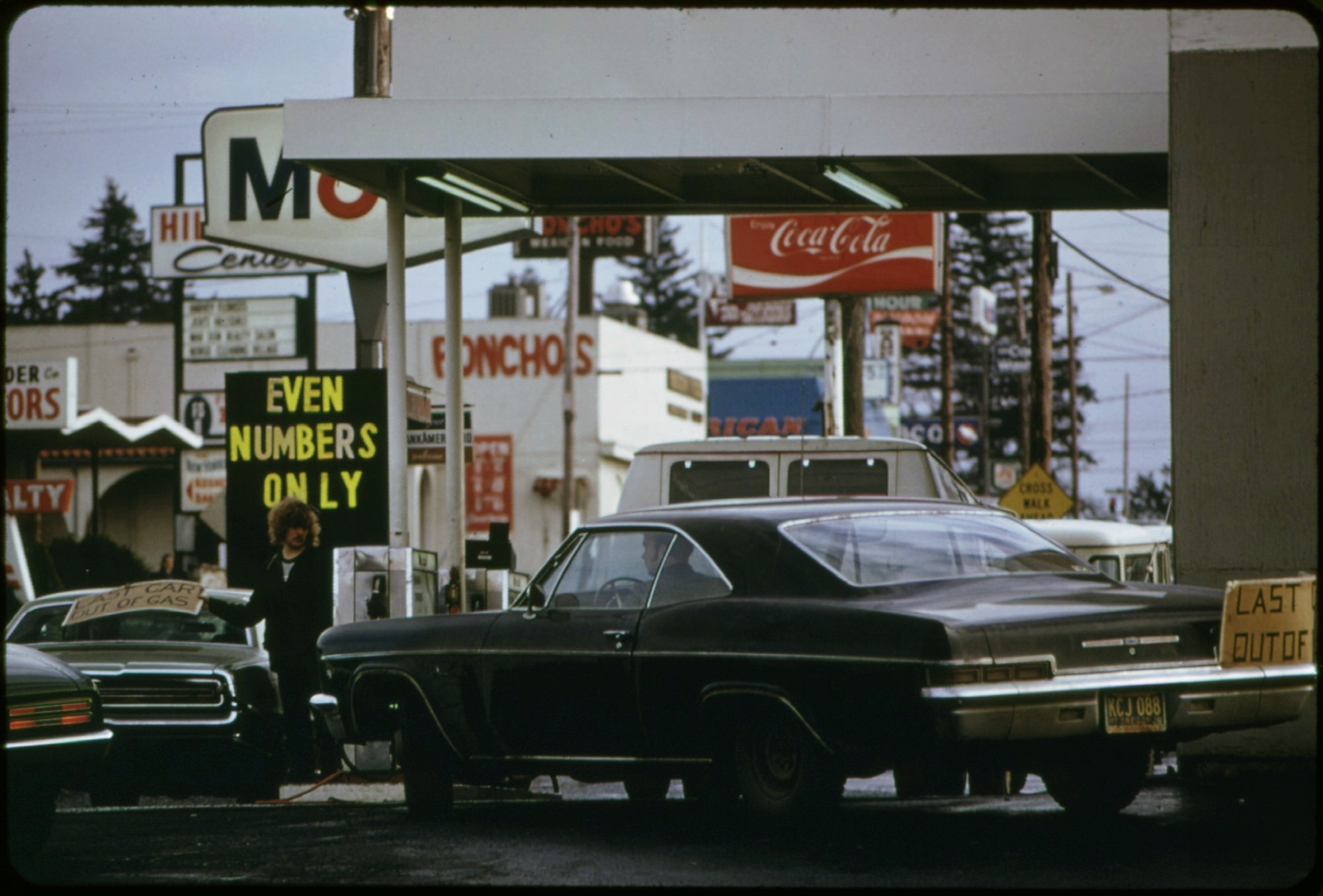
Gas shortage due to oil crisis, Portland, OR, 1973, David Falconer

Photographers working for the Documerica project received $150 a day (equivalent to $1,155 in 2025), along with film and expenses. More than 80,000 photographs were submitted to Gifford D. Hampshire. A selection were kept to become part of the collection, while copies and the unselected images were returned to the photographers. Because the images were part of a federal government project, photographers were required to waive their copyright, placing the images in the public domain.

Like the photographers of the Federal photographic project of the Farm Security Administration during the Great Depression, some of the Documerica photographers interpreted their mission rather broadly, and sometimes artistically. Many of the photographs preserve a distinct visual record of time and place.

== Public access ==
Perhaps a quarter of the images were publicly shown during the 1970s. A group of 155 photographs was shown in an exhibition Documerica 1 at the Corcoran Gallery of Art in Washington, D.C. for six weeks in the summer of 1972. A number of small traveling exhibits were sent to cities such as New Orleans, Cincinnati, Dallas, and Philadelphia, and the Smithsonian Institution Traveling Exhibition Service (SITES) created the exhibit Our Only World for display at the EPA's Visitors Center and as a traveling exhibit.

Digital scans of over 15,000 of the original 35 mm color slides and black-and-white negatives and prints are available through the National Archives and Records Administration's Archival Research Catalog.

The quality of the images varies. Older copies made from the original color transparency films tend to be inferior to the quality of the originals. In 2013, the National Archives in Washington, D.C., displayed a curated exhibition, "Searching for the Seventies: The Documerica Photography Project". Curator Bruce Bustard selected a set of images from the Documerica collection and arranged to reprint them from the original slides. The quality of the resulting color images was much higher than that of older color reprints, which had degraded. One hundred reprinted images from the Documerica project were reprinted in the exhibition book Searching for the Seventies: The Documerica Photography Project (2013), edited by Bruce I. Bustard.

External videos
- “Documerica”, ETHEL, trailer from 2013 Next Wave Festival

In 2013 the string quartet Ethel created a multimedia show called Ethel's Documerica which incorporated images from the DOCUMERICA archives. The show premiered at the Brooklyn Academy of Music and went on a national tour managed by Baylin Artists Management.

== Gallery ==
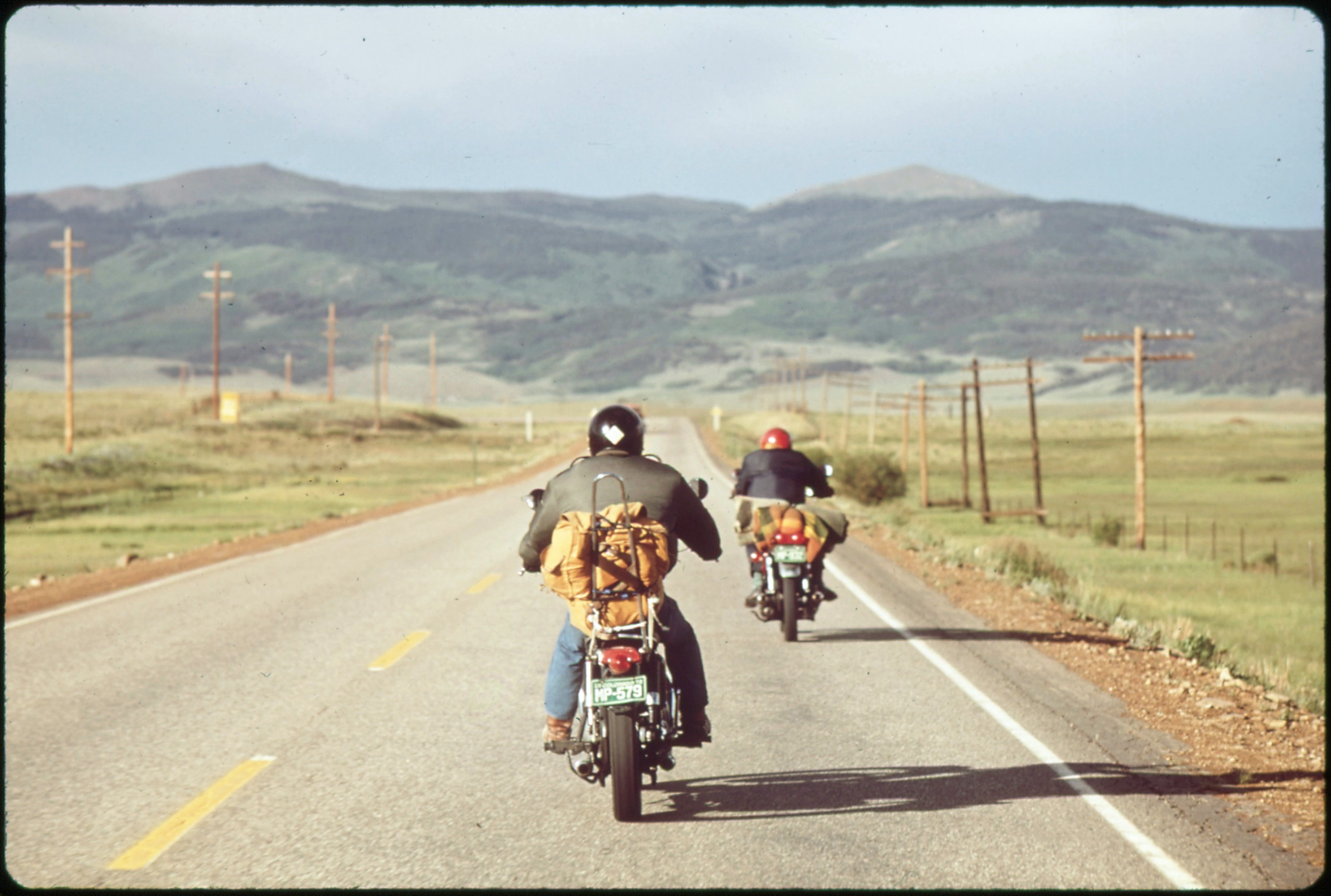
Bikers in Colorado, 1972, Boyd Norton

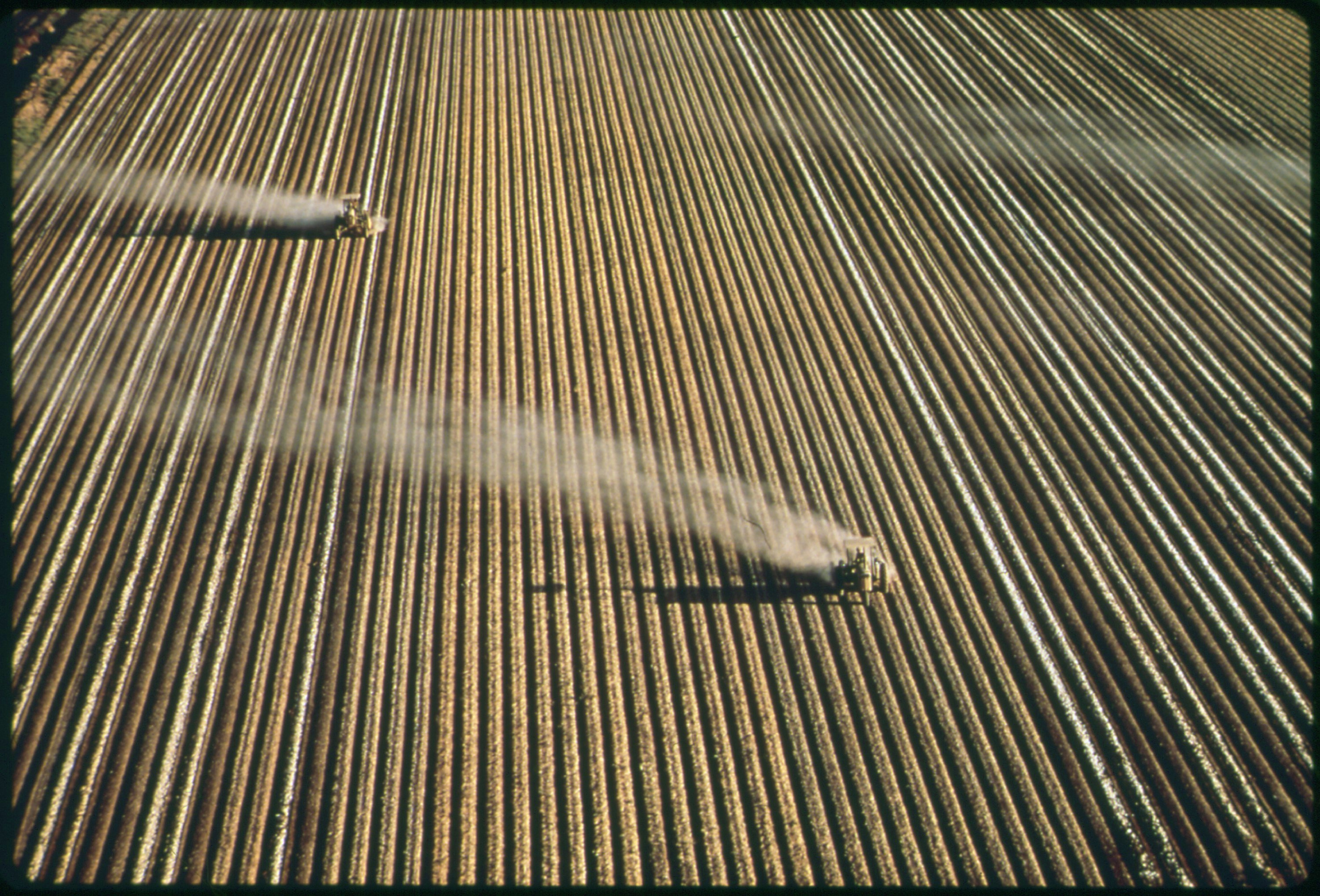
Fertilizing the Imperial Valley, CA, 1972, Charles O'Rear

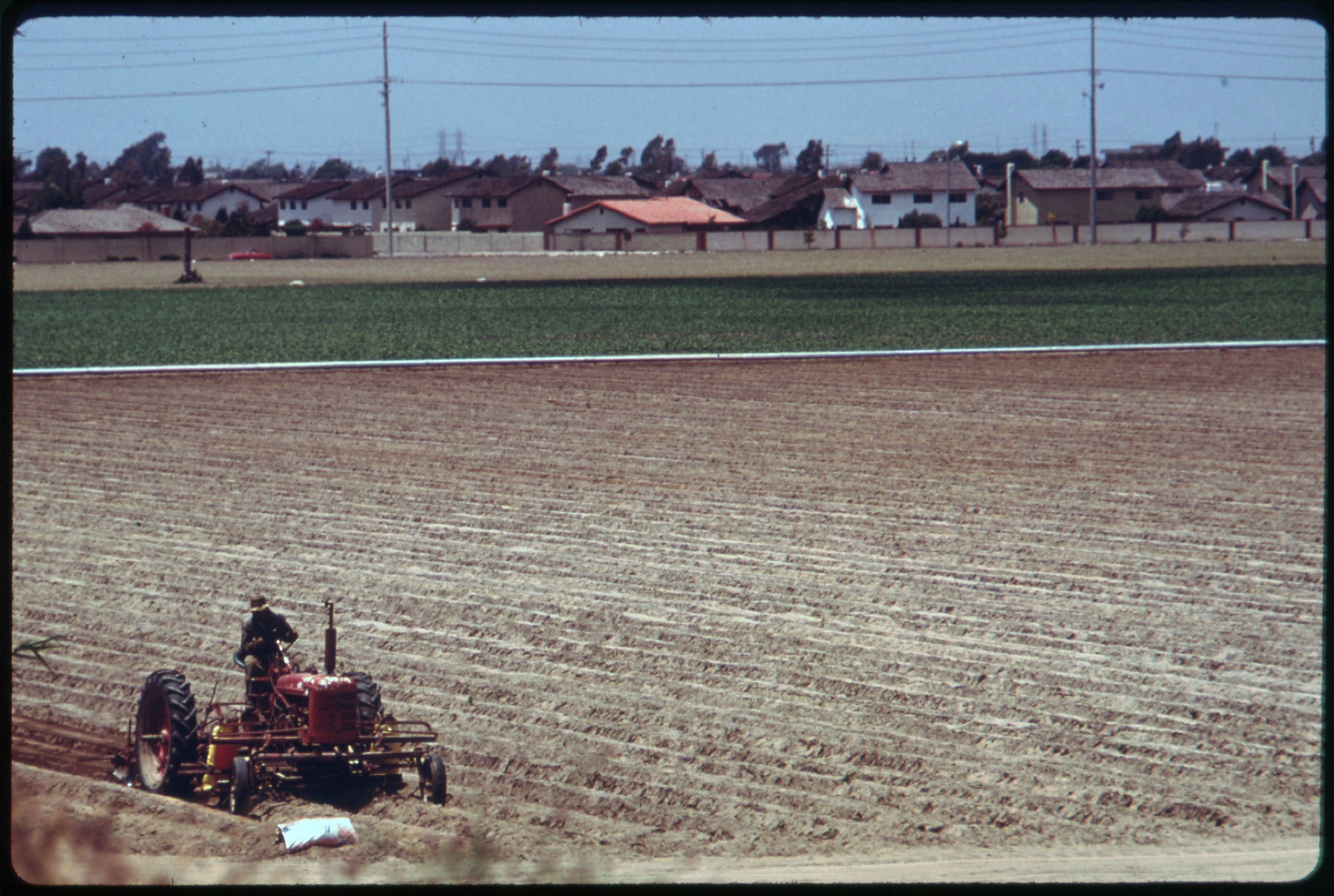
Suburbanization, Orange County, CA, 1975, Charles O'Rear

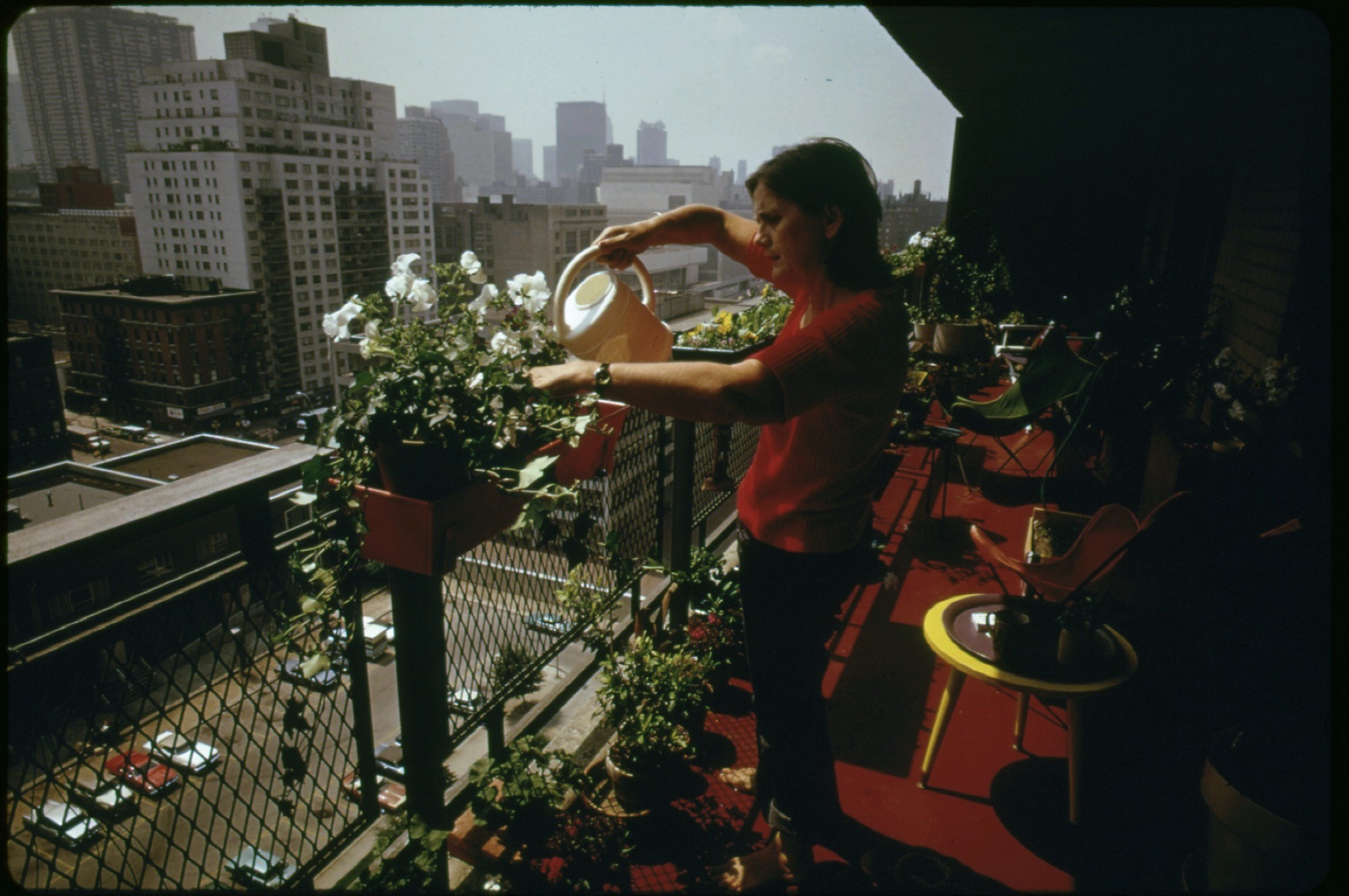
Nature in New York City, 1974, Suzanne Szasz

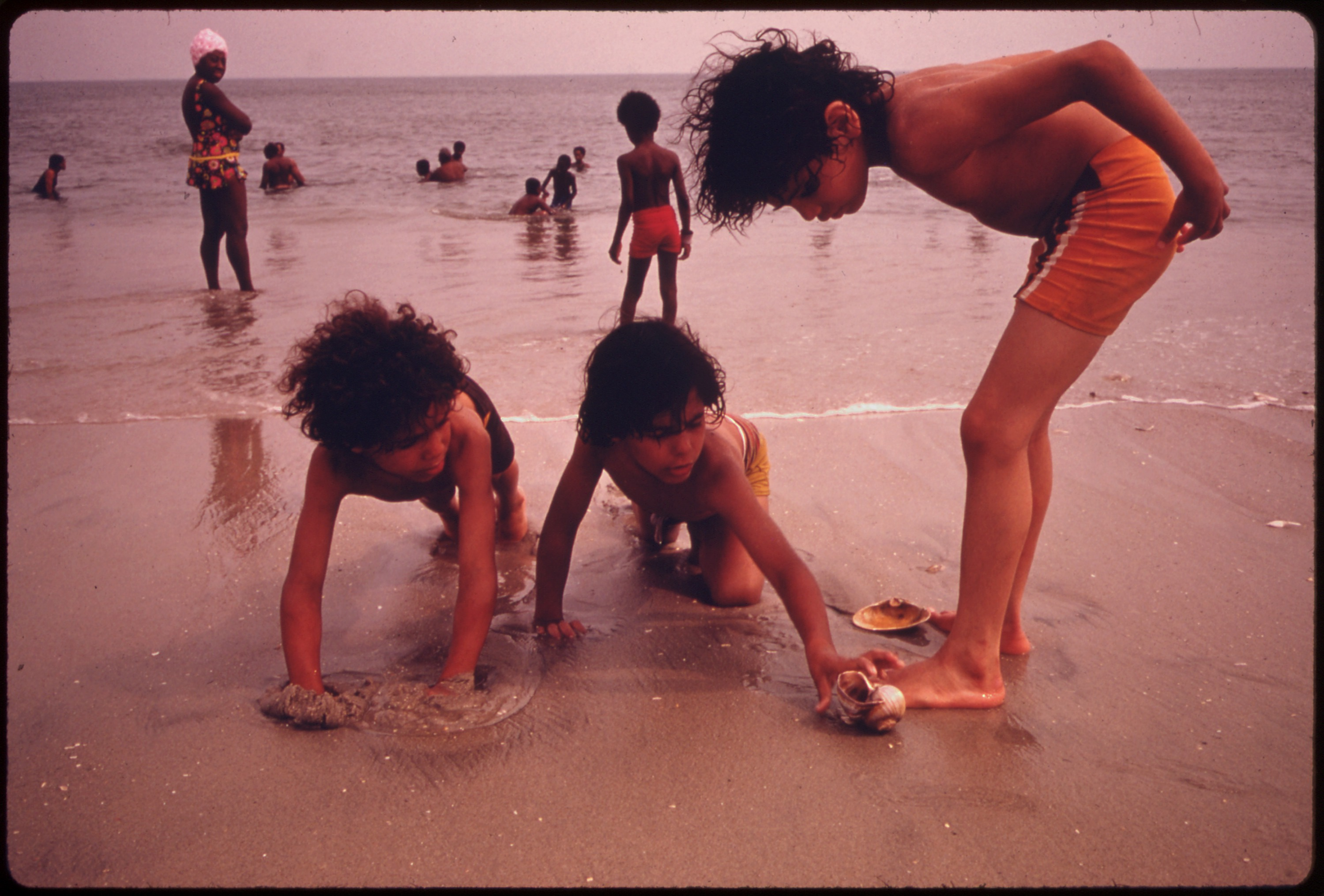
Children at a Brooklyn beach, 1974, Danny Lyon

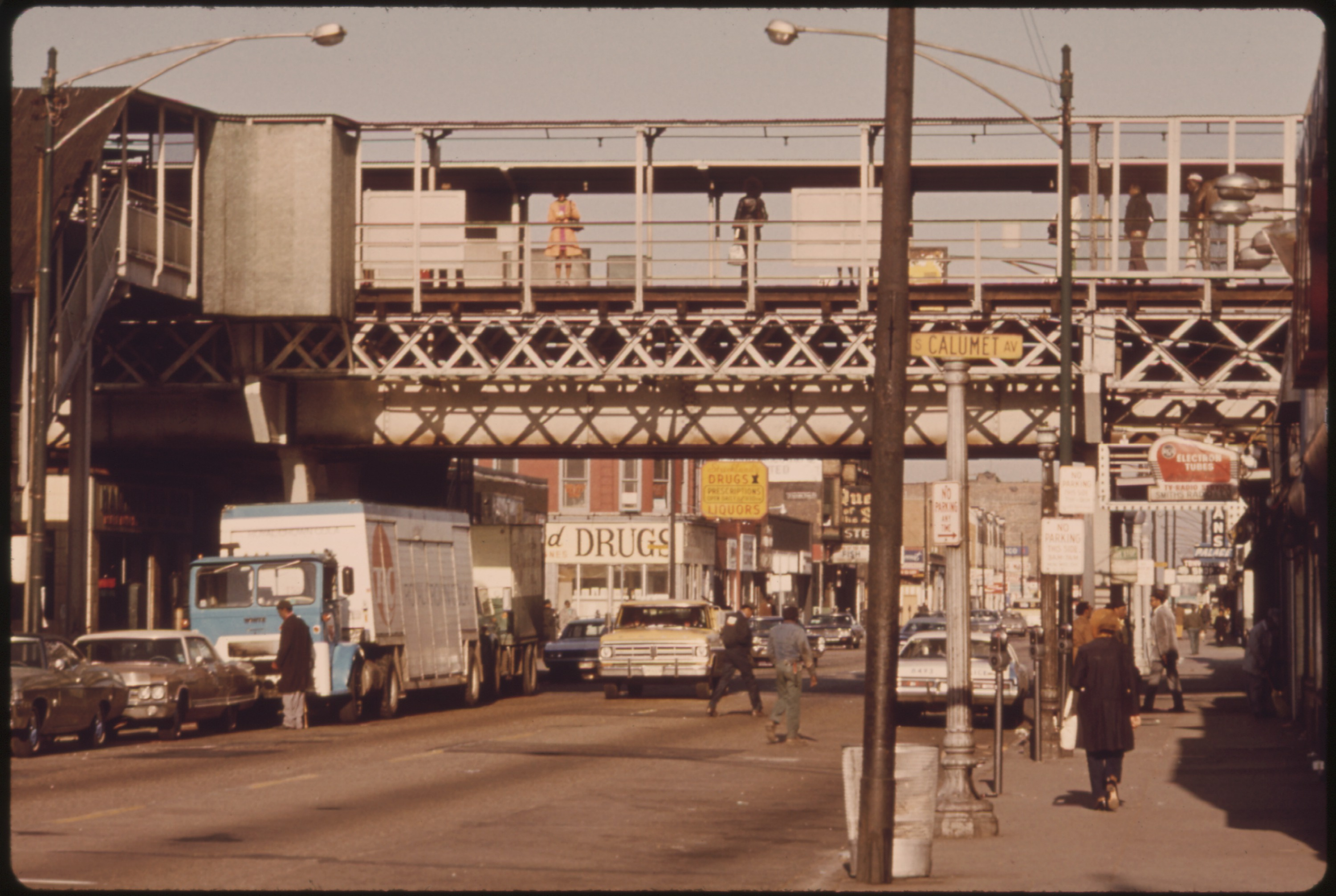
63rd Street, Chicago, 1973, John H. White

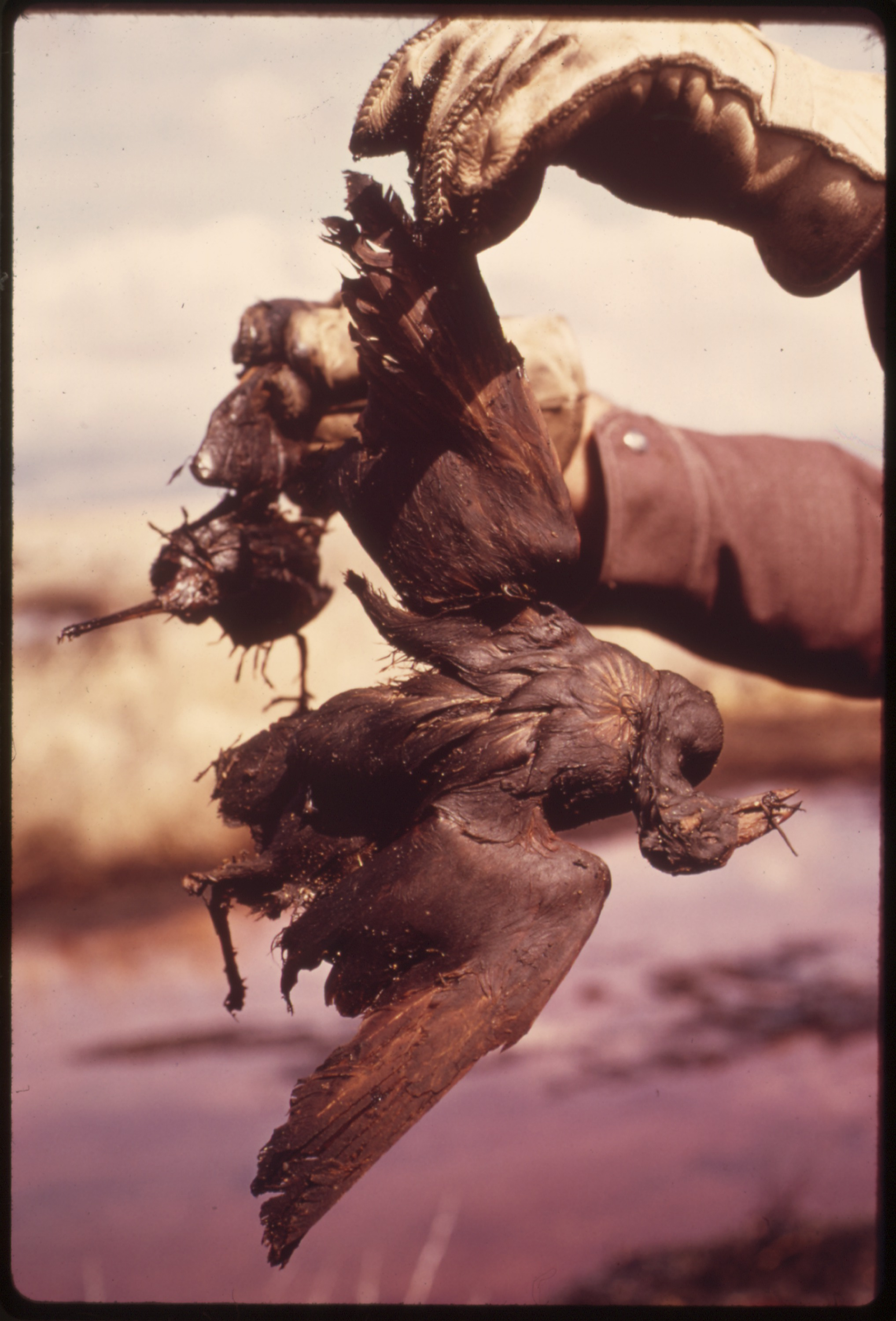
Duck killed by polluted pond, Utah, 1974, Bruce McAllister

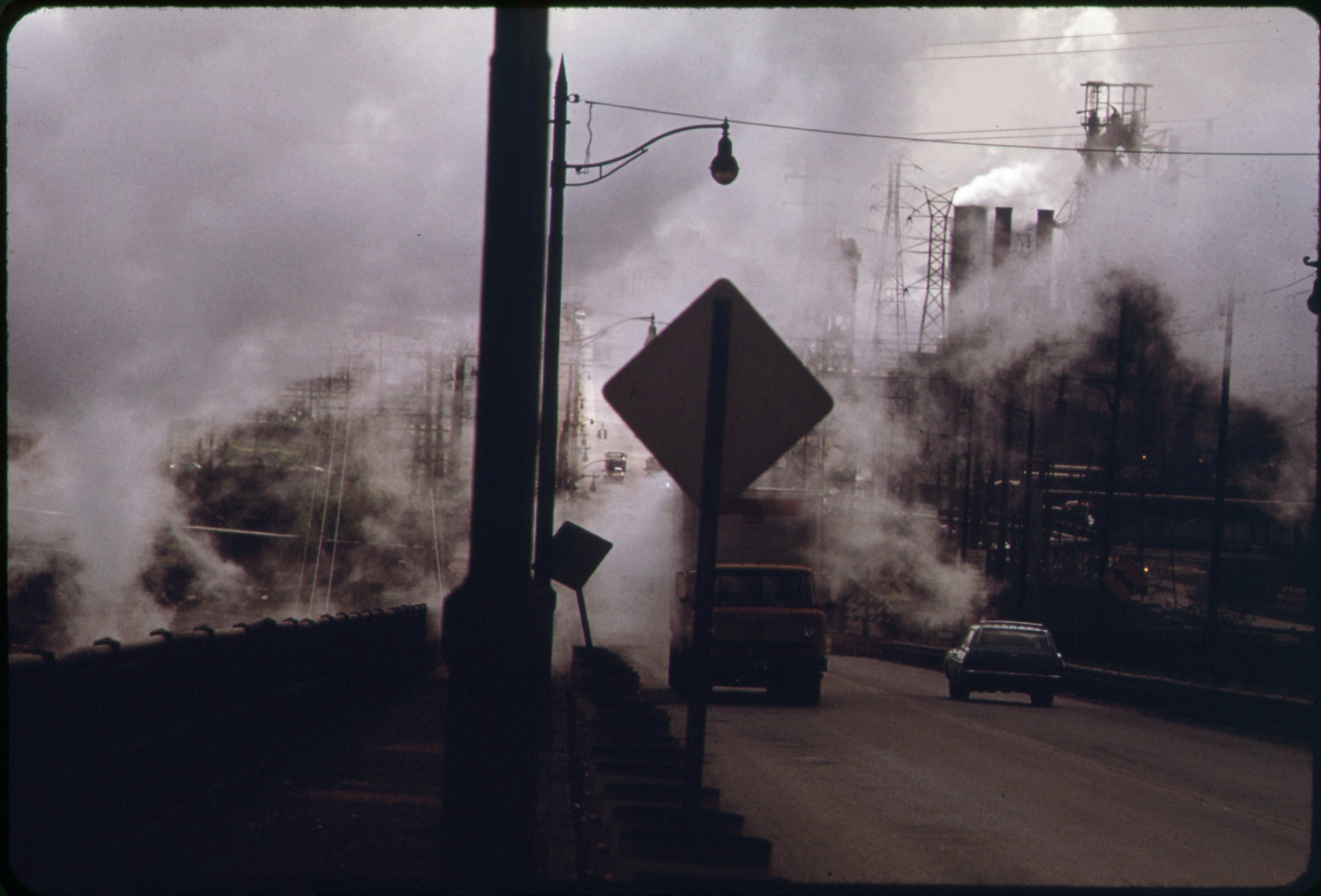
Air pollution, Cleveland, OH, 1973, Frank John Aleksandrowicz

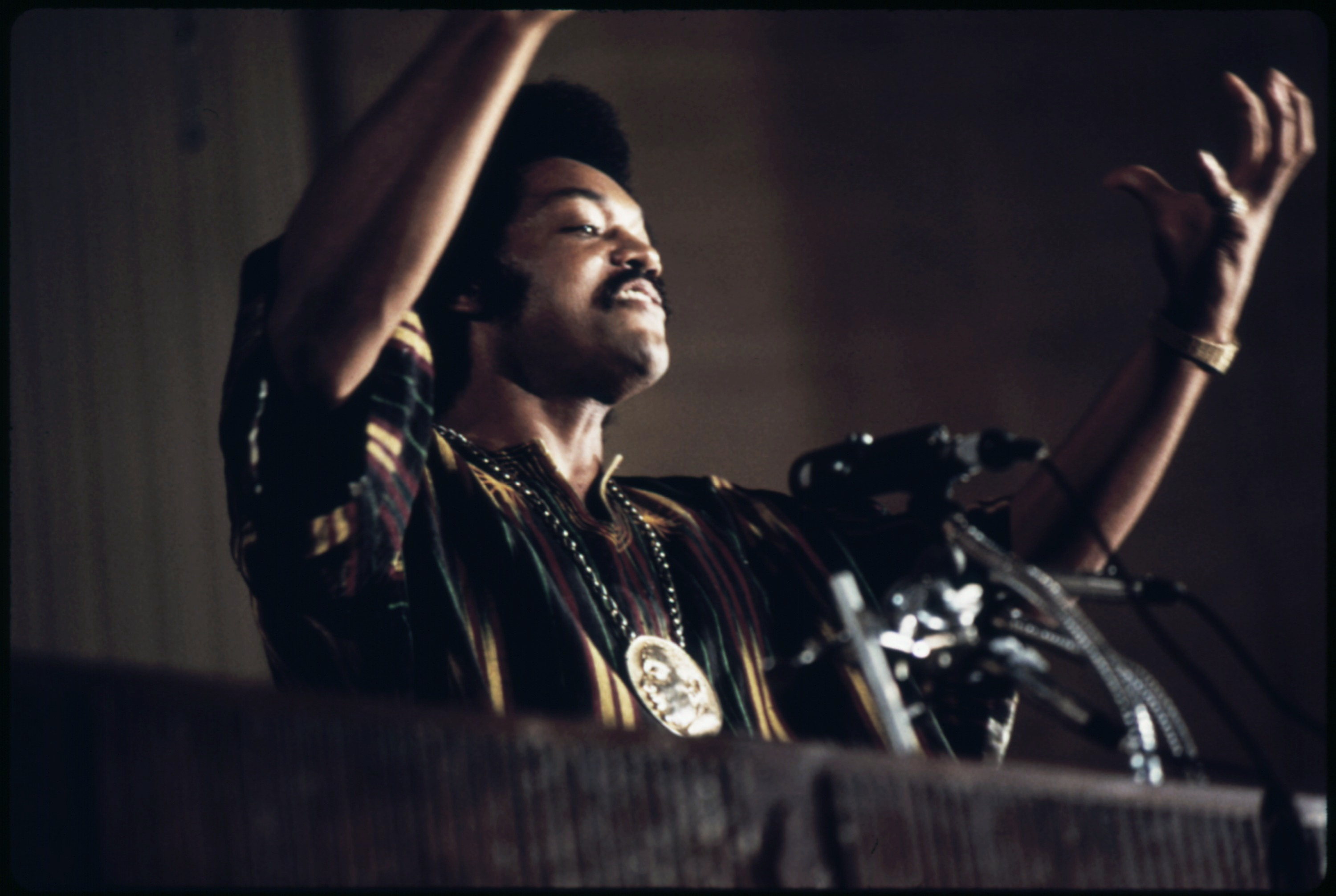
Jesse Jackson, Chicago, 1973, John H. White

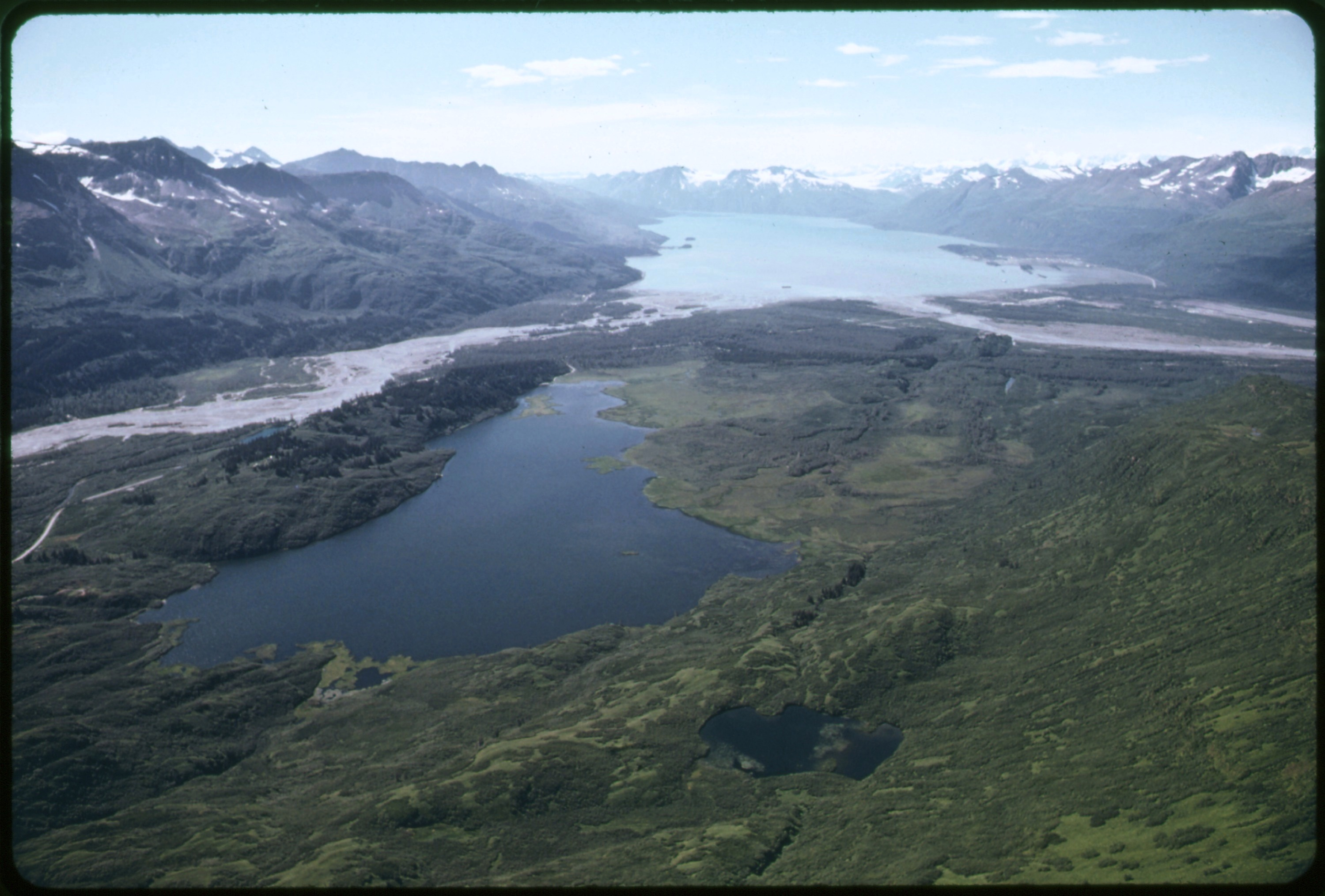
Future terminus of Trans-Alaska Pipeline, 1974, Dennis Cowals

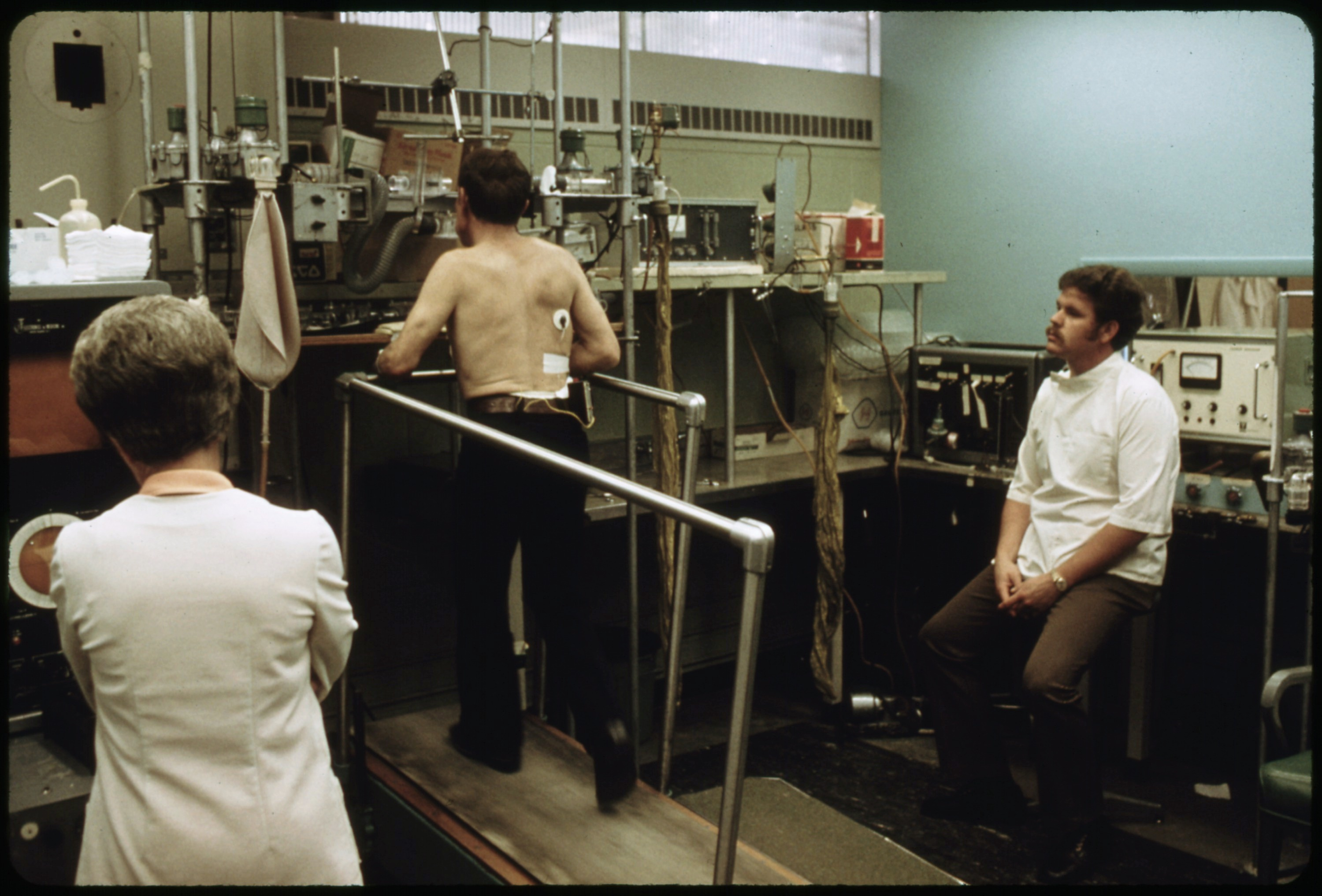
Testing in the black lung laboratory, West Virginia, 1974, Jack Corn
