= Flip Schulke =

American photojournalist

- Born: June 24, 1930; New Ulm, Minnesota
- Died: May 15, 2008 (aged 77)
- Education: Macalester College
- Known for: Photography

Graeme Phelps "Flip" Schulke (June 24, 1930 – May 15, 2008) was an American photographer.

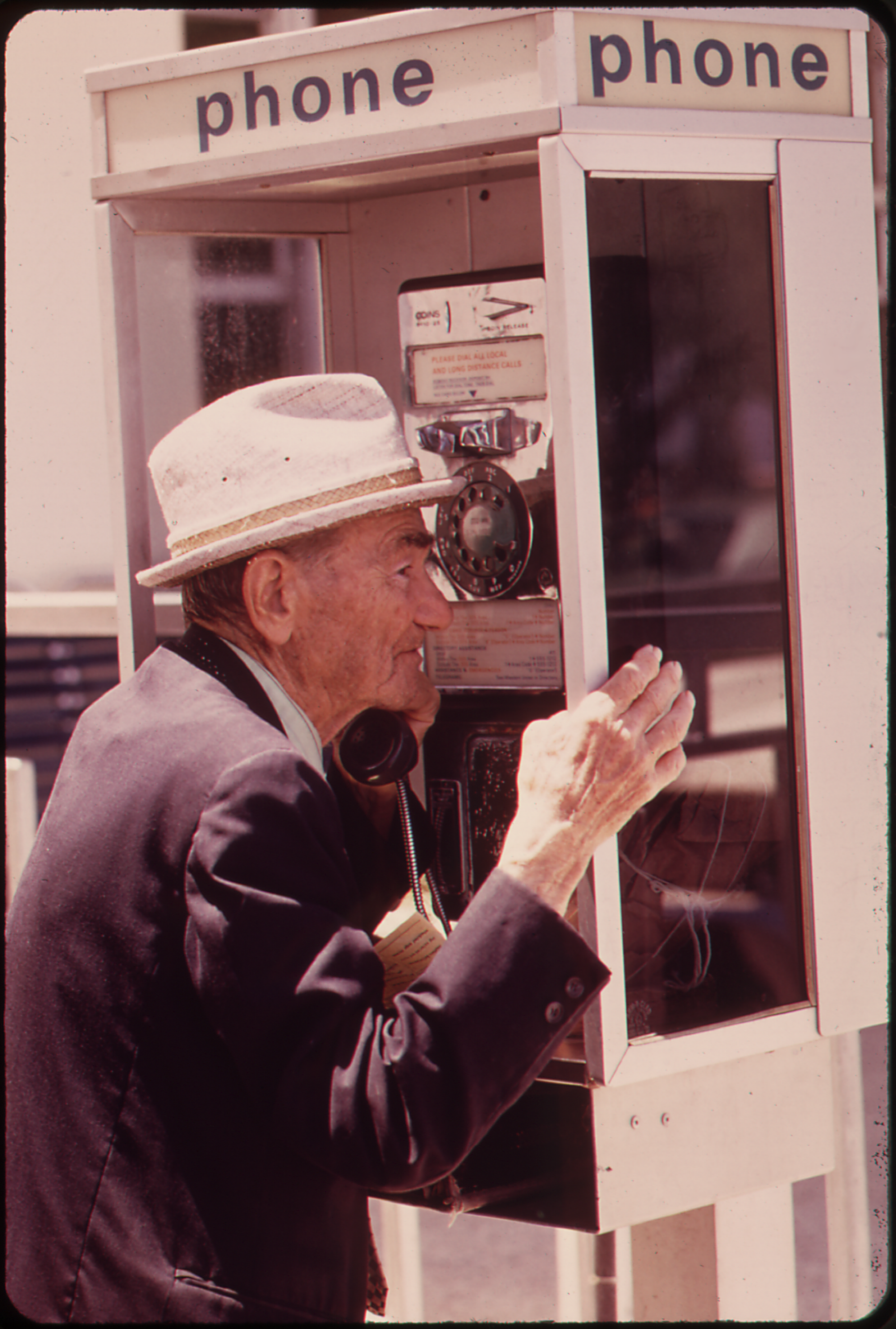
A photograph by Schulke from Documerica

== Early life and education ==
Schulke grew up in New Ulm, Minnesota. His nickname "Flip" came about from his interest in gymnastics. He graduated from Macalester College, then moved to Miami.

== Career ==
He taught briefly at the University of Miami, then began working as a freelance photographer. He worked for Life, and covered a variety of events, including the Cuban Revolution.

In 1962, he visited and photographed the Berlin Wall.

Schulke began photographing the civil rights movement in the American south as early as 1956.

Schulke formed a bond with civil rights activist Martin Luther King Jr. after an all-night conversation in 1958, and began photographing him. King invited Schulke to photograph secret planning meetings of the Southern Christian Leadership Conference, though not all of the activists trusted him being there. He also photographed the 1963 March on Washington and the 1965 Selma to Montgomery March. They traveled together until King's death in 1968, which upset Schulke so much that he stopped covering the civil rights movement and began to work on more commercial projects. In all, he took around 11,000 photographs of King, including some of his funeral.

Schulke photographed Muhammad Ali, Jacques Cousteau, Fidel Castro and John F. Kennedy. He also was a photographer for the Environmental Protection Agency's Documerica program in the early 1970s.

== Later life ==
Schulke died on May 15, 2008, at age 77.

The Dolph Briscoe Center for American History at the University of Texas at Austin holds 300,000 of his photographs. His photographs are also held in a variety of museums, including the Harvard Art Museums, the Cleveland Museum of Art, the National Museum of American History, the University of Michigan Museum of Art, the Minneapolis Institute of Art, and the Lehigh University Art Galleries.
