= Marc St. Gil =

American photographer (1924–1992)

Marc St. Gil (February 10, 1924 – August 13, 1992) was a Dutch-American photographer, best known for his work with the Environmental Protection Agency.

== Life ==
St. Gil was born in Helmond, Netherlands on February 10, 1924. Following his immigration to the US, he became a photojournalist, eventually being hired as a contributing photographer to the young EPA's DOCUMERICA project. He died on August 13, 1992, in Katy, Texas.

=== DOCUMERICA ===
DOCUMERICA was an EPA-sponsored program created "photographically document subjects of environmental concern" lasting from 1971 to 1977. Among the dozens of prominent photographers hired for the program, St. Gil specialized in documenting nature, rural life, and pollution in Southern Texas, with the focus of his work being in and around Leakey, Houston and San Antonio. The National Archives and Records Administration has digitized part of his photographic portfolio, and his works produced for DOCUMERICA are in the public domain, with hundreds of images available on Wikimedia Commons and Flickr.

== Gallery ==
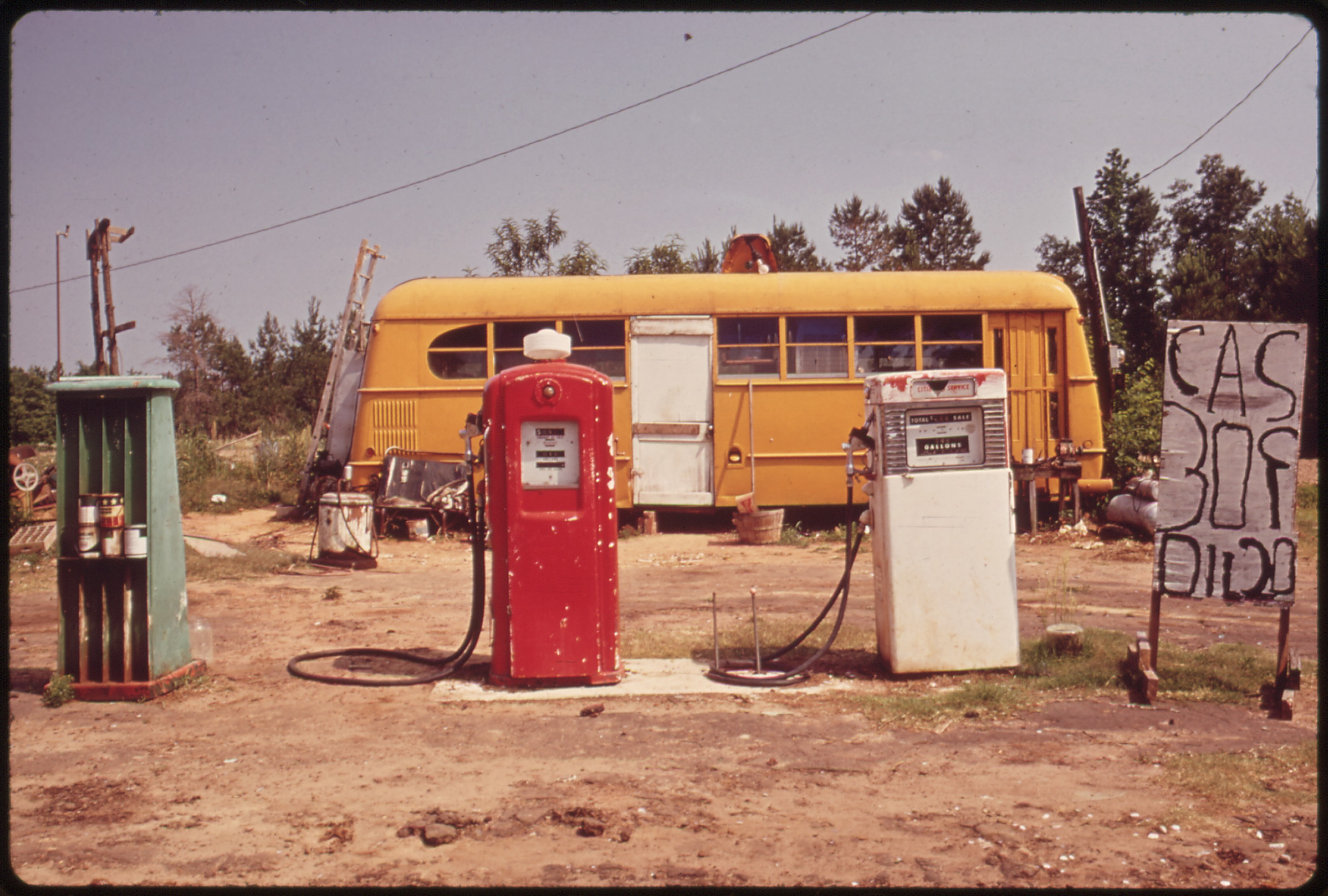
Cut-rate gas station operates out of bus

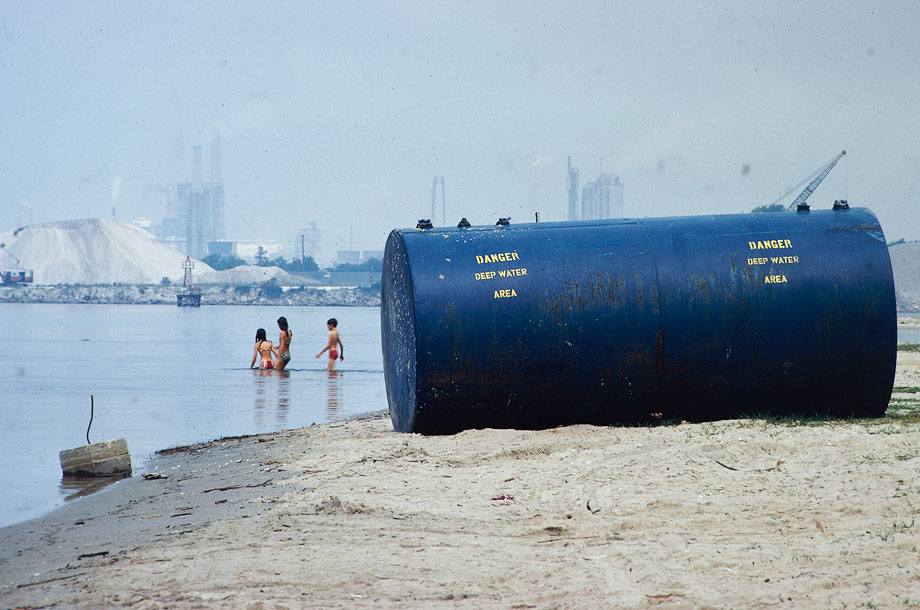
Chemical plants on shore are considered a prime source of pollution for Lake Charles

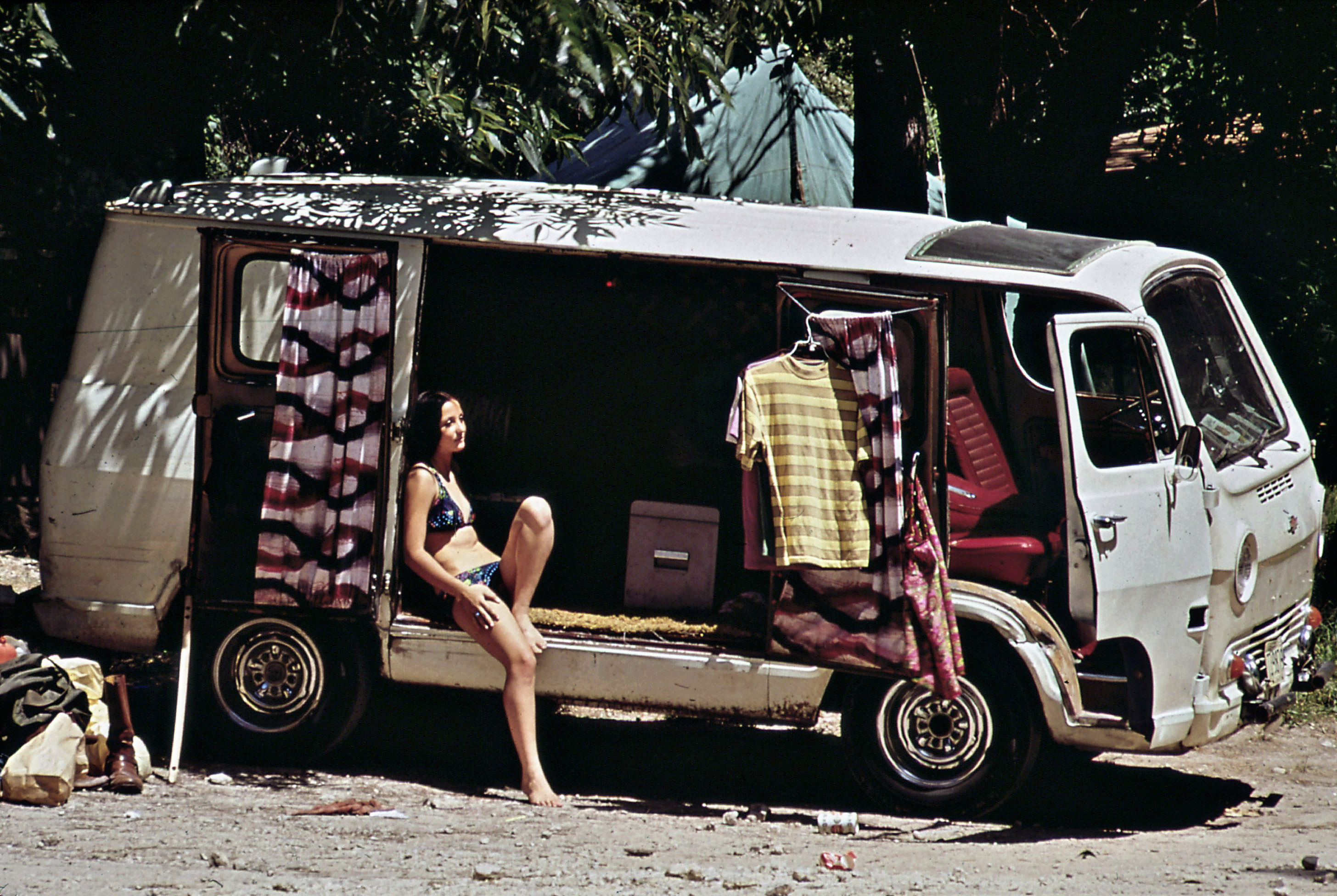
Campers in Garner State Park

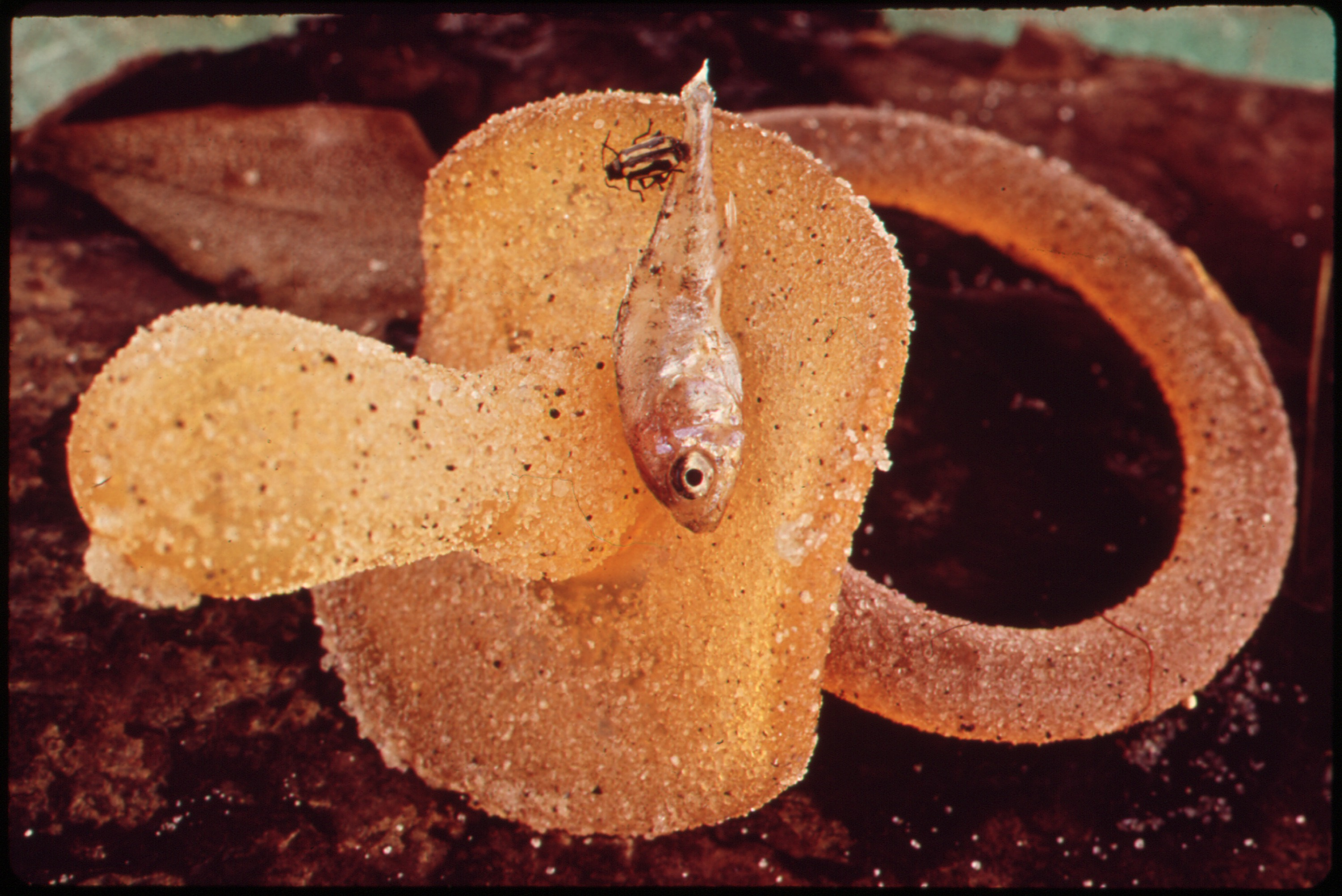
Cluse-up of garbage and tiny dead fish washed ashore along Lake Charle

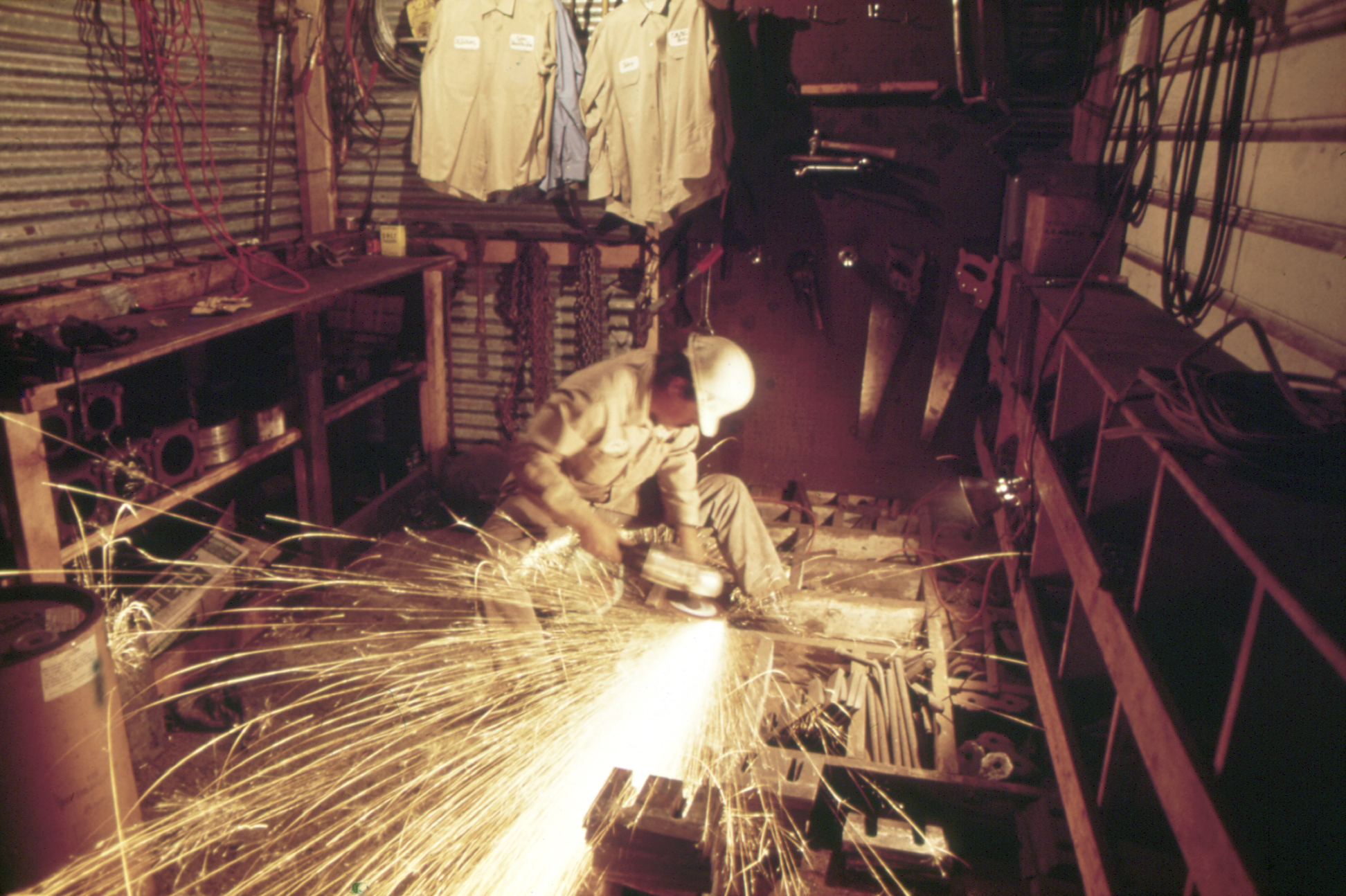
Machinery being repaired at a cedar mill near Leakey, Texas

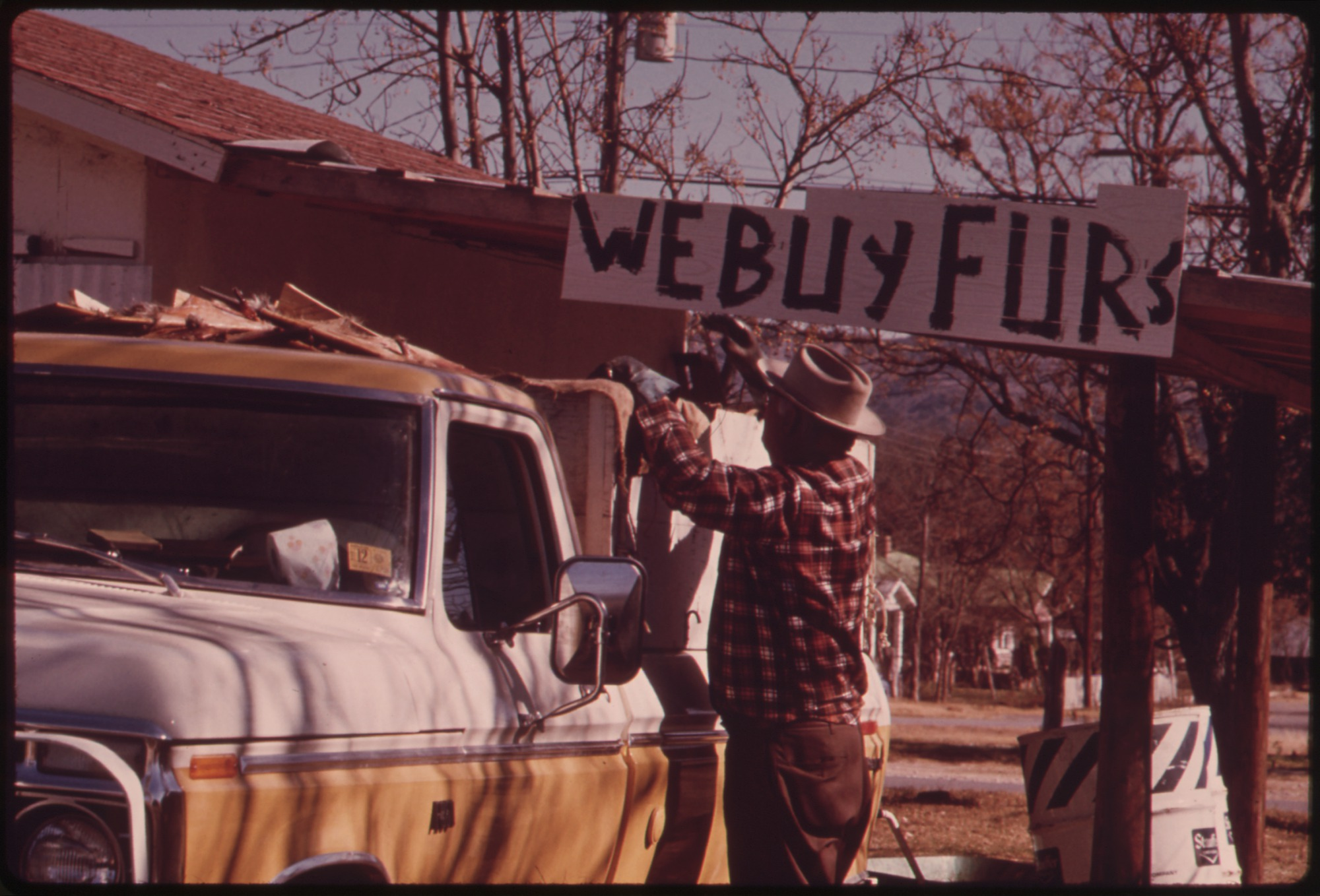
Fur Buying and Selling Is Brisk During the Hunting Season in Leakey, Texas

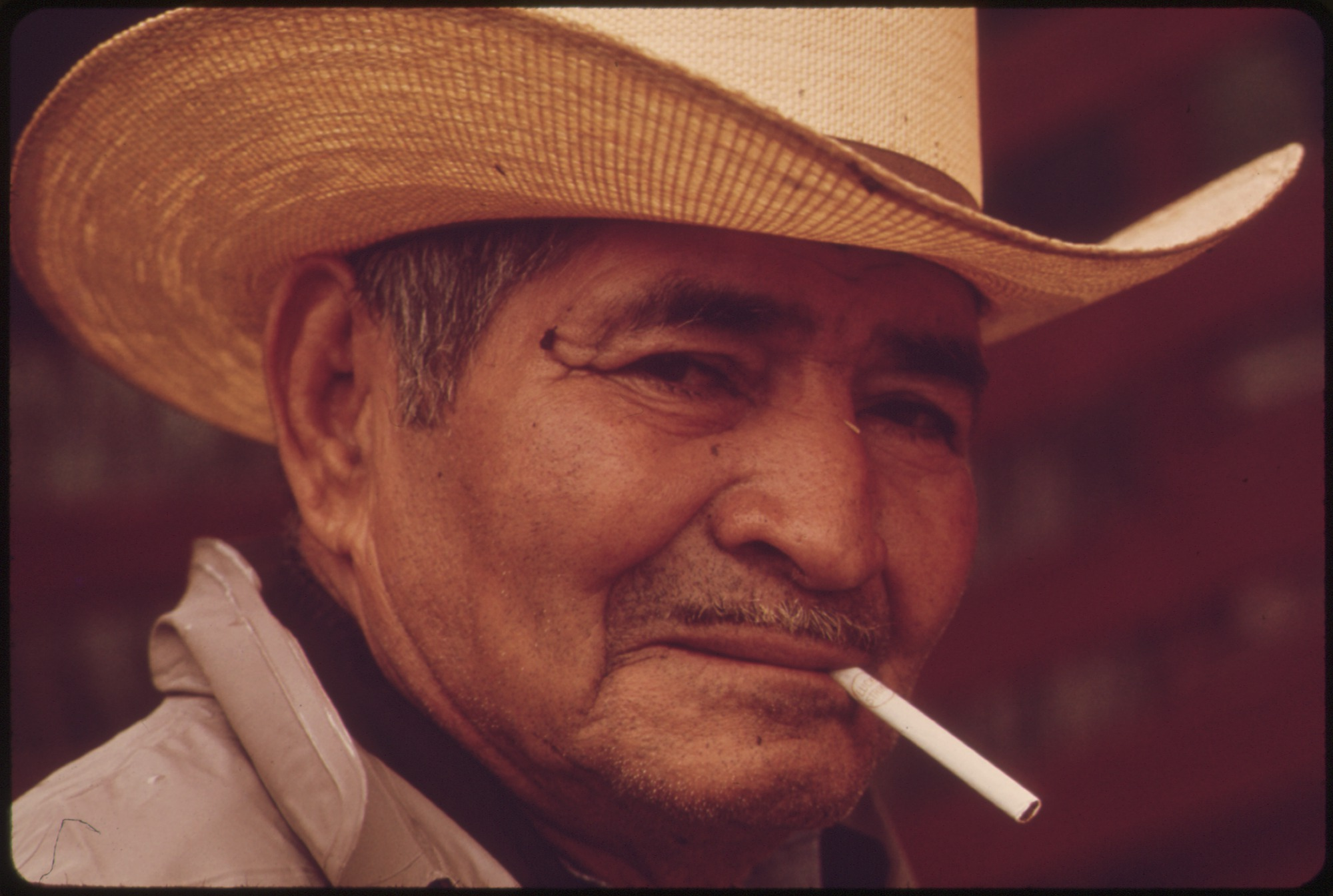
Ranch hand who works in the area near Leakey, Texas

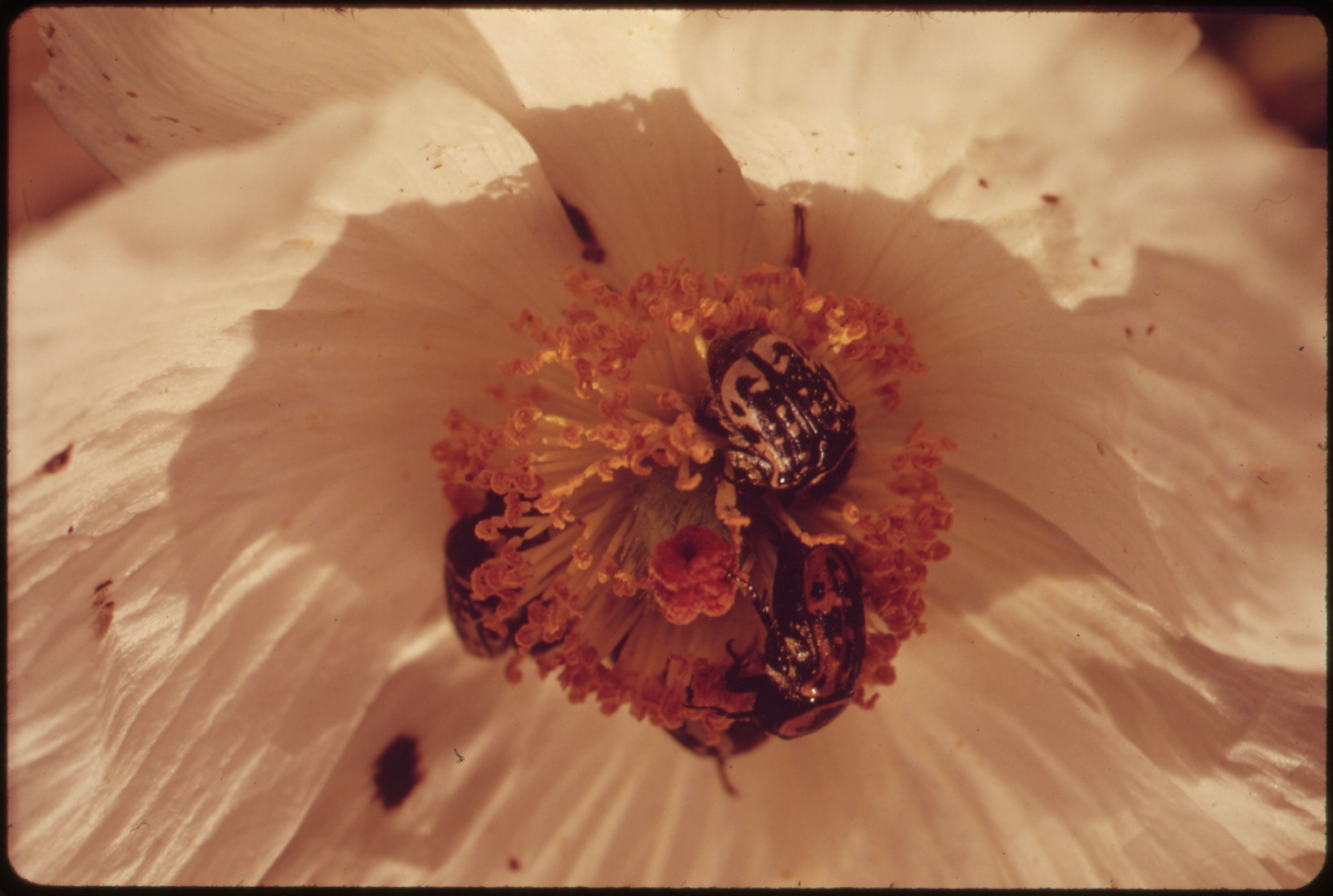
Closeup of a prickly poppy flower populated with beetles in the Texas countryside

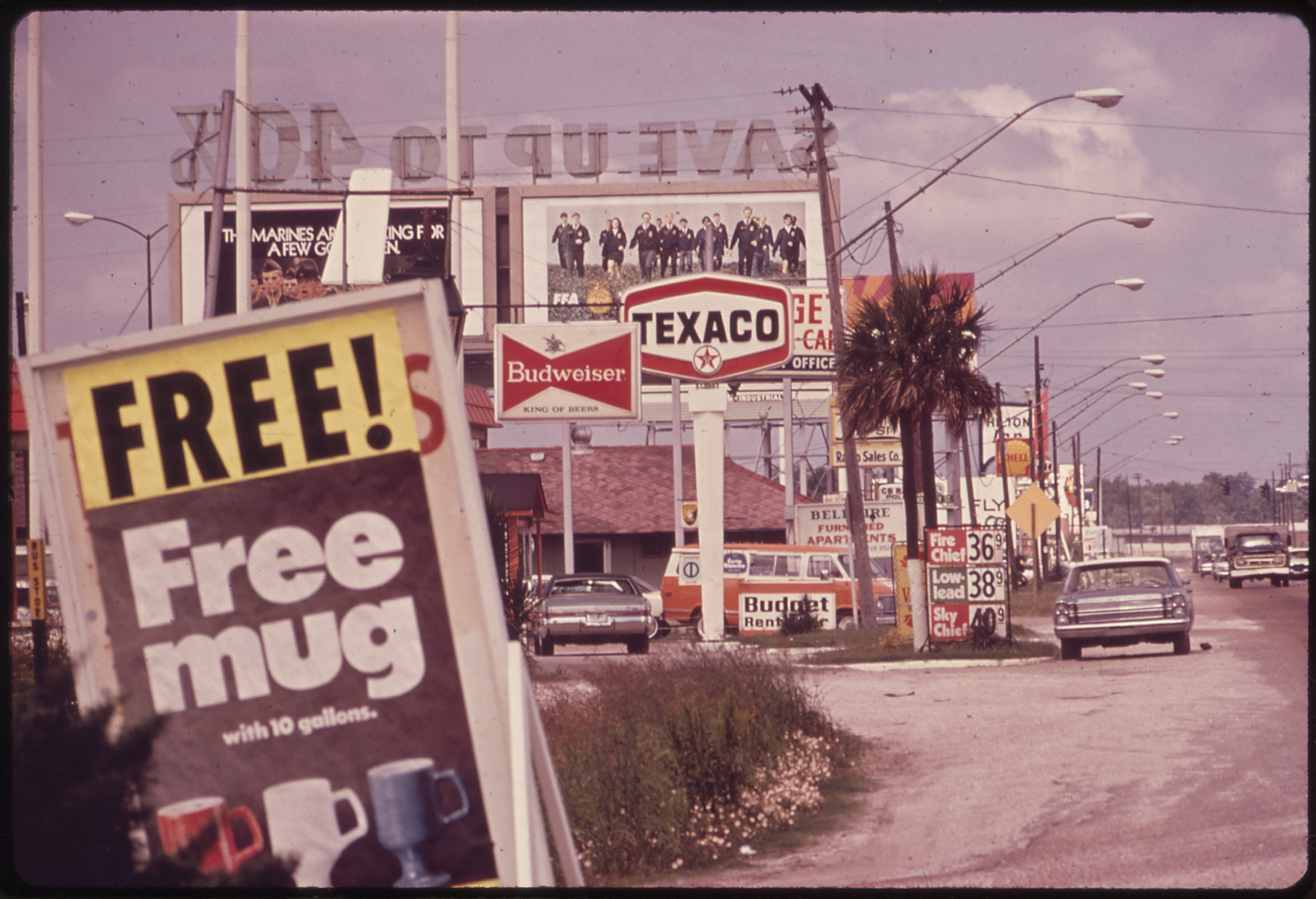
Billboards and advertising clutter
