= Galbraith Lake Airport =

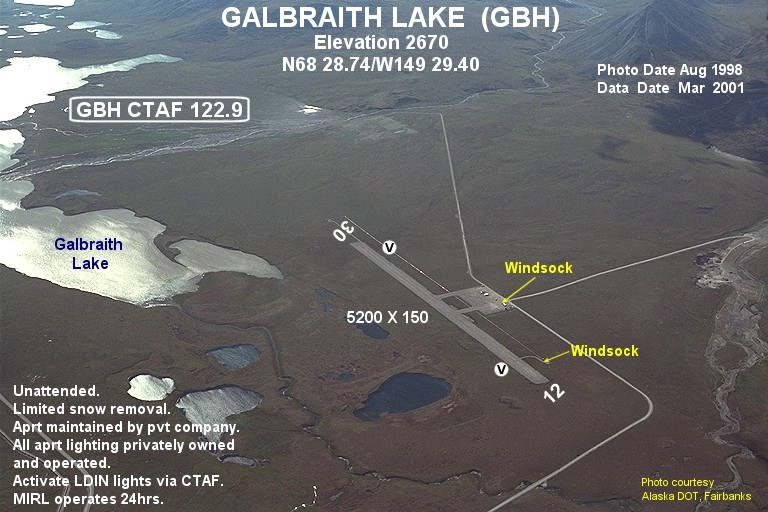
- View of airport and lake from the north
- IATA: GBH; ICAO: PAGB; FAA LID: GBH

Summary
- Airport type: Public
- Owner: State of Alaska DOT&PF
- Serves: Galbraith Lake, Alaska
- Elevation AMSL: 2,663 ft (812 m)
- Coordinates: 68°28′47″N 149°29′24″W

Map
- Location of Galbraith Lake Airport PAGB (North America)

Runways
Direction	Length		Surface
Direction	ft	m	Surface
13/31	5,182	1,579	Gravel

Statistics (2008)
- Aircraft operations: 361
- Source: Federal Aviation Administration

Galbraith Lake Airport (IATA: GBH, ICAO: PAGB, FAA LID: GBH) is a state-owned, public-use airport located at Galbraith Lake in the North Slope Borough of the U.S. state of Alaska. The Arctic National Wildlife Refuge has an office at the airport. The lake and airport are located west of the Dalton Highway and north of the Trans-Alaska Pipeline System's Pump Station 4. According to the FAA's National Plan of Integrated Airport Systems for 2009–2013, it was classified as a general aviation airport.

== Facilities and aircraft ==
Galbraith Lake Airport has one runway designated 13/31 with a gravel surface measuring 5,182 by 150 feet (1,579 x 46 m). For the 12-month period ending July 10, 2008, the airport had 361 aircraft operations, an average of 30 per month: 49% air taxi, 44% general aviation, and 7% scheduled commercial.

== Accidents ==
- 30 August 1974: Alaska International Air Lockheed L-100 Hercules N100AK exploded at Galbraith Lake Airport while unloading gasoline. The flight engineer died of burns almost three weeks later.

== See also ==
- List of airports in Alaska
