= Atigun River =

River in Alaska, United States

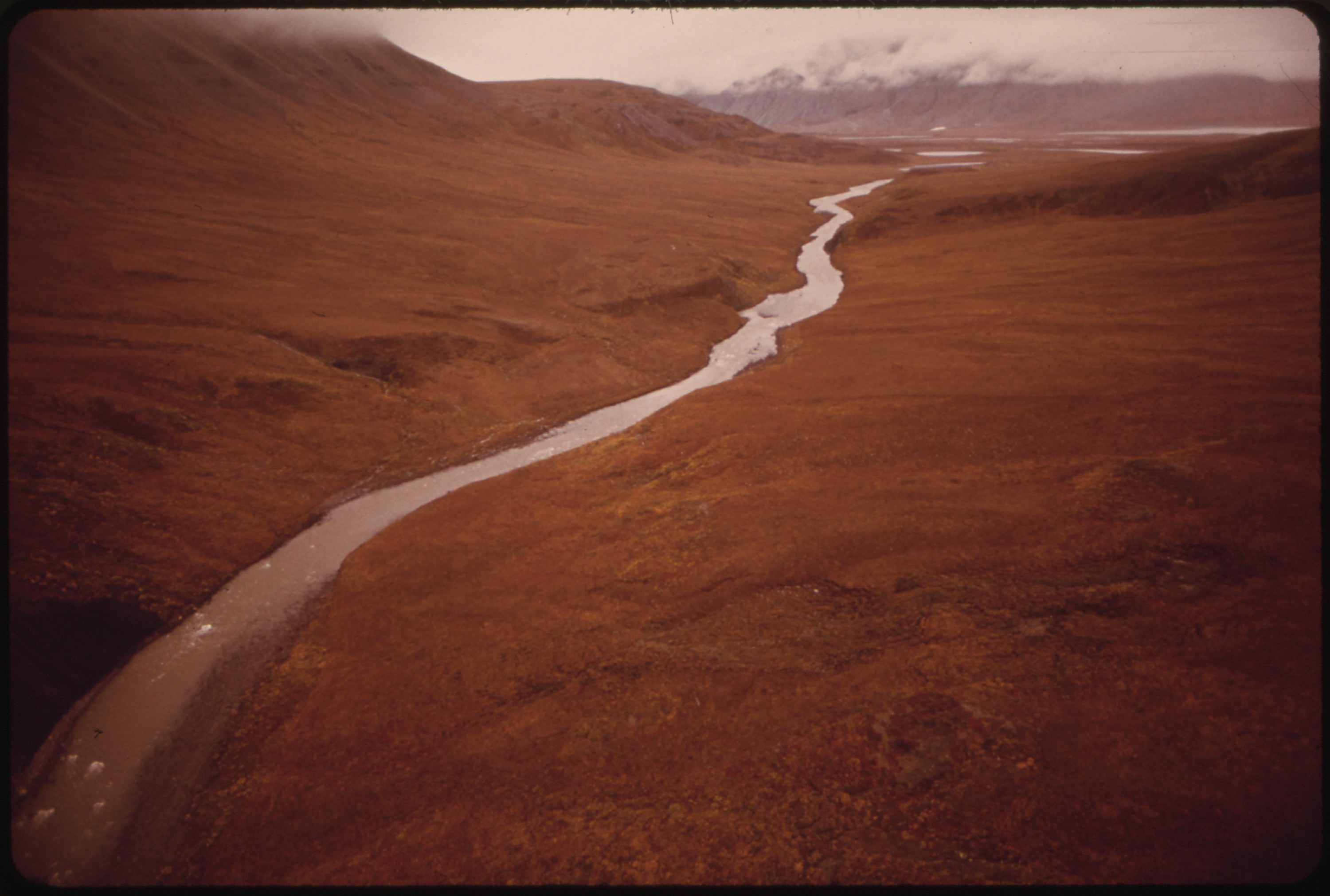
- Atigun River flowing towards the mouth of Atigun Gorge (Dennis Cowals, 1973)

- Location in Alaska

Physical characteristics
- Source
  - coordinates: 68.1219444°N 149.4591667°W
- Mouth
  - coordinates: 68.5252778°N 149.0033333°W
  - elevation: 621 meters
- Length: 45 m (148 ft)

Basin features
- River system: Sagavanirktok River

The Atigun River (/ˈætəɡən/) is a river in the Endicott Mountains in northern Alaska, United States. The source is a glacier terminus, from which it flows northeast to the Sagavanirktok River 20 miles south of its junction with the Ribdon River. It is 45 miles long.
