= Atigun Gorge =

Valley in North Slope Borough, United States of America

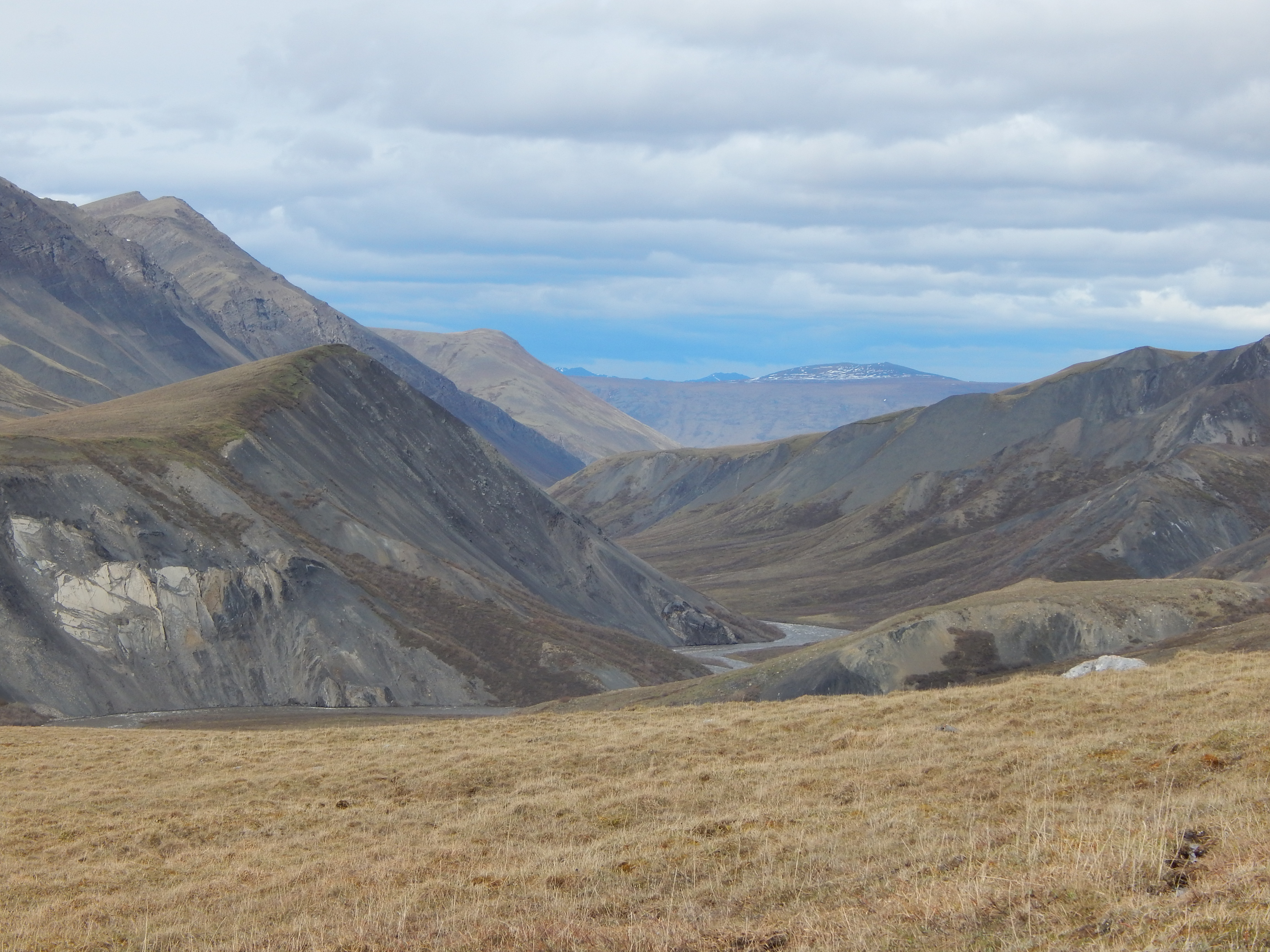
- Atigun Gorge, June 2014

- Location within Alaska
- Floor elevation: 655 m (2,149 ft)

Geography
- Coordinates: 68.5210192°N 149.0896839°W
- Interactive map of Atigun Gorge

Atigun Gorge is a valley located along the Atigun River, 2 miles east of Galbraith Lake in northern Alaska. It was first named in 1971.

It is an important travel corridor for wildlife within the Arctic National Wildlife Refuge, and is specifically valuable to Dall sheep. It is also a popular hiking destination.
