= Galbraith Lake =

Lake located in Alaska, US

- Location within Alaska Location within North America
- Location: North Slope Borough, Alaska
- Coordinates: 68°28′N 149°25′W
- Basin countries: United States
- Max. length: 3.6 miles (5.8 km)

Galbraith Lake is a lake located in the North Slope Borough of Alaska, United States. The surrounding area is uninhabited except for seasonal residents.

The lake is located on the west side of the Dalton Highway between miles 272-75 of the highway. The lake is approximately 3.6 miles (5.8 km) long and was formed by glaciers, and is known to contain lake trout, burbot and grayling fish, with some reports of Arctic char. A campground is also located near the lake.

The lake was named in 1951 after Bart Galbraith, a bush pilot who died in a 1950 plane crash while flying from Barter Island to Barrow.

Galbraith Lake Airport is located in the area, as well as Pump Station 4 of the Trans-Alaska Pipeline System.

A work camp was located at Galbraith Lake during the construction of the pipeline. An oil spill near the camp in 1975 caused some oil to enter the lake and a slick to appear on its surface. Clean up efforts were then conducted.

The infrastructure of the pipeline construction project in the 1970s also permitted the conduct of archeological investigations in the area, which previously had not been explored, funded by the Alyeska Pipeline Service Company.

== Campground ==
The Galbraith Lake Bureau of Land Management Campground is 359 miles north of Fairbanks and 140 miles south of Deadhorse at the 275 mile mark.

== Climate ==
Galbraith Lake has a cold subarctic climate, bordering on a true tundra climate. Snow has occurred in all three summer months. During the construction of the Alaska Pipeline a weather station was operated at the construction site. Because the weather station was operated for only a decade, the temperature record is irregular, with December the coldest month of the year, and record highs and lows less extreme than those of nearby locations. Likewise, the precipitation record is incomplete, with some months having less than ten years of record.

Climate data for Galbraith Lake
Month	Jan	Feb	Mar	Apr	May	Jun	Jul	Aug	Sep	Oct	Nov	Dec	Year
Mean daily maximum °F (°C)	2 (−17)	−4 (−20)	3 (−16)	19 (−7)	42 (6)	56 (13)	61 (16)	59 (15)	40 (4)	16 (−9)	10 (−12)	−5 (−21)	25 (−4)
Mean daily minimum °F (°C)	−18 (−28)	−25 (−32)	−21 (−29)	−6 (−21)	19 (−7)	36 (2)	40 (4)	37 (3)	20 (−7)	−3 (−19)	−11 (−24)	−24 (−31)	4 (−16)
Average precipitation inches (mm)	0.68 (17)	0.26 (6.6)	0.39 (9.9)	0.12 (3.0)	0.36 (9.1)	1.42 (36)	0.93 (24)	1.60 (41)	0.70 (18)	1.00 (25)	0.50 (13)	0.51 (13)	8.46 (215)
Average snowfall inches (cm)	8.5 (22)	2.9 (7.4)	6.8 (17)	1.4 (3.6)	0 (0)	0.7 (1.8)	0.5 (1.3)	trace	4.6 (12)	9.2 (23)	6.6 (17)	5.0 (13)	46.1 (117)

== Prior names ==
Aerial view of Galbraith Lake Camp, 1973

Alternate prior names for the lake were "Natravak Lake" and "Sagavanirktok Lake." "Natravak" is an Eskimo name for "big lake" and a common name in northern Alaska.
