= List of accidents and incidents involving the Lockheed C-130 Hercules =

More than 15 percent of the approximately 2,350 Lockheed C-130 Hercules production hulls have been lost, including 70 by the US Air Force and the United States Marine Corps during the Vietnam War. Not all US C-130 losses have been crashes, 29 of those listed below were destroyed on the ground by enemy action or other non-flying causes.

From 1967 to 2005, the Royal Air Force (RAF) recorded an accident rate of about one Hercules loss per 250,000 flying hours. United States Air Force Hercules (A/B/E-models), as of 1989, had an overall attrition rate of 5 percent as compared to 1 to 2 percent for commercial airliners in the U.S., according to the NTSB, 10 percent for B-52 bombers, and 20 percent for fighters (F-4, F-111), trainers (T-37, T-38), and helicopters (H-3).

This is thought to be a complete listing through July 1, 2012, but omits the JC-130A (53-3130, c/n 3002) test airframe that was tested to destruction and airframes retired or withdrawn from service. By the nature of the Hercules' worldwide service, the pattern of losses provides a barometer of global hotspots over the past fifty years.

== Guide to Hercules construction numbers ==
The two prototype YC-130s, AF Serial Numbers 53-3396 and 53-3397, were built at the Burbank, California plant, and were given c/ns 1001 and 1002. Production Hercules have all been built at the Lockheed-Marietta, Georgia plant, and began their c/ns at 3001 (USAF 53-3129, still extant at the Air Force Armament Museum). The first prototype, c/n 1001, was disassembled at Warner Robins AFB in October 1960. The second prototype, c/n 1002, was salvaged at Indianapolis, Indiana in April 1962. (Lars Olausson, Lockheed Hercules Production List, 1954–2008, April 2007, page 2.) There have been a small number of c/ns assigned to airframes on order that were not built for various reasons. Also, C-130A model production ended at c/n 3231, and a new series for the B-model began at c/n 3501, the only time a large block was skipped for an upgraded airframe.

Some 2,500 hulls have been built or are on order. USMC KC-130J BuNo 167111, c/n 5580, delivered December 2006 to VMGR-352, is the 2,300th Hercules. As of 2011, constructor numbers have been projected for anticipated orders through c/n 5800, with projected delivery in 2015 (Olausson, Production List, March 2011).

== Hercules crashes by country of operator ==
=== Algeria ===
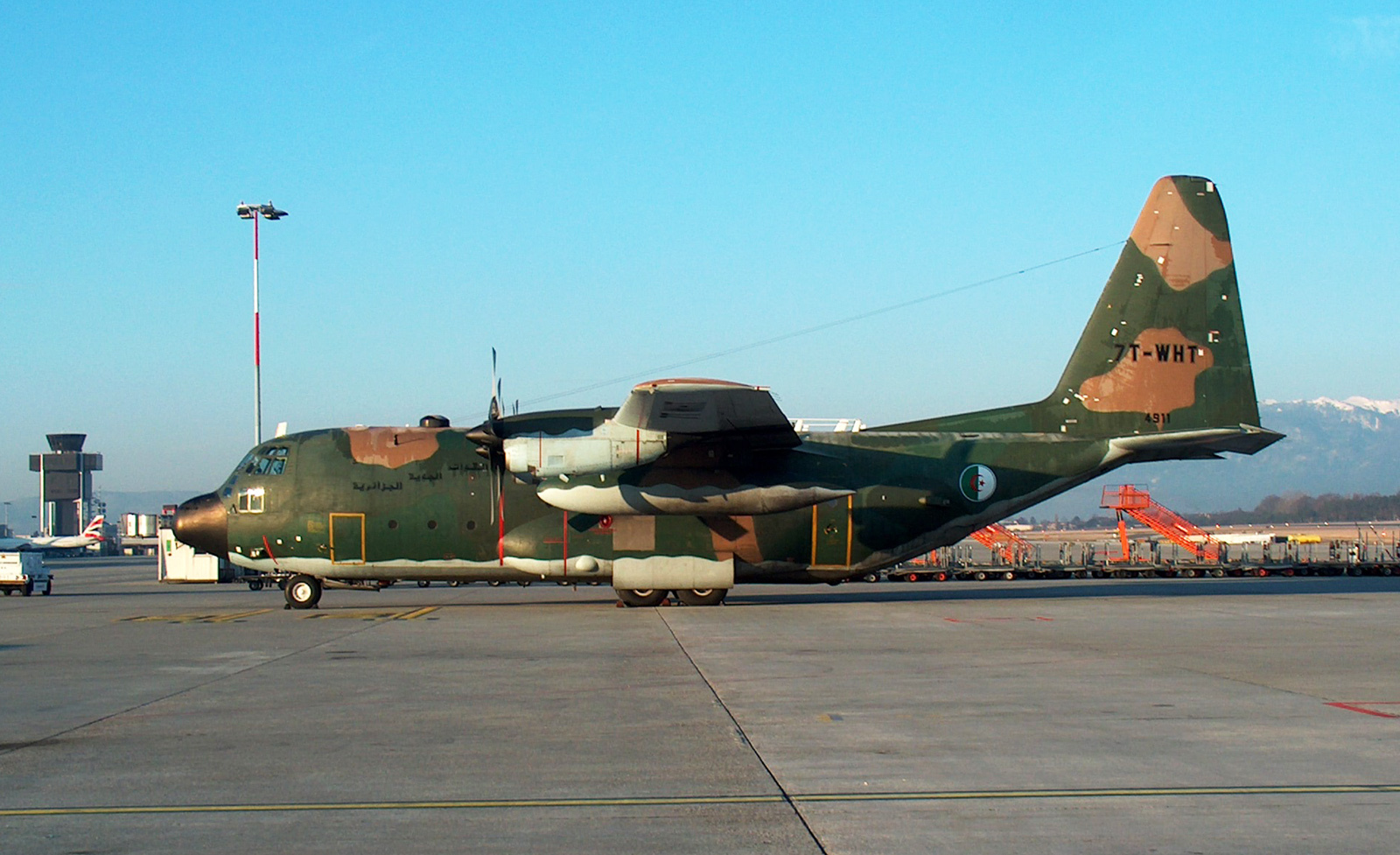
7T-WHT, the C-130H crashed in 2018

- June 30, 2003: Algerian Air Force C-130H (MSN 382-4926) 7T-WHQ crashed shortly after takeoff from Boufarik Airport, after an engine caught fire. The Hercules crashed into the Beni Mered district on the outskirts of Blida, destroying at least four houses. All five crew and ten people on the ground were killed.
- August 13, 2006: L-100-30 (MSN 382-4880) 7T-VHG of Air Algérie was destroyed when it collided with terrain following a high-rate descent from 24,000 feet in Piacenza, Italy. The pilot, co-pilot, and flight engineer were killed.
- February 23, 2009: An Algerian Air Force C-130 crashed, details not known.
- February 11, 2014: Algerian Air Force C-130H-30 (MSN 382-4919) 7T-WHM crashed in a mountainous area en route to Constantine, killing all but one of the four crew and 74 passengers on board.
- June 3, 2018: Algerian Air Force C-130H (MSN 382-4911) 7T-WHT crashed when it skidded off runway after landing, eight crew members and skydiving instructors on board injured. The fuselage broke in two just behind the wing.

=== Angola ===
- May 16, 1981: L-100-20 (MSN 382-4830) D2-EAS of Angola Air Charter shot down by infrared missile near Menongue, Angola.
- June 8, 1986: L-100-20 (MSN 382-4832) D2-THA of Angola Air Charter wheels up landing, Dondo, Angola, written off.
- January 5, 1990: L-100-30 (MSN 382-4222) D2-FAG of Angola Air Charter hit by missile at Menongue, Angola, crash landed, written off.
- April 7, 1994: L-100-30 (382-4679) D2-THC of TAAG Angola Airlines damaged beyond repair by fire after landing at Malenge, Angola, overheated brakes.
- January 2, 1999: L-100-30 (MSN 382-4839) D2-EHD of Transafrik and operating for the United Nations shot down by UNITA after take-off from Huambo, Angola.

=== Argentina ===
- August 28, 1975: C-130E (MSN 382-4309) TC-62 of the Argentine Air Force was destroyed when a bomb placed by Montoneros exploded on the runway in front of the aircraft during take-off from Tucuman, Argentina. Six of 114 Gendarmes on board were killed. See Operativo Independencia for the background history.
- June 1, 1982: C-130E (MSN 382-4310) TC-63 of the Argentine Air Force was shot down by Royal Navy Sea Harrier XZ451, of HMS Invincible air group, coded '006', piloted by Lieutenant Commander Nigel Ward, with AIM-9L Sidewinder missile and guns during the Falklands War (Spanish: Guerra de las Malvinas/Guerra del Atlántico Sur).
- May 15, 1996: C-130H (MSN-4576) TC-67 of the Argentine Air Force was damaged beyond repair on bad weather landing at Tandil, Argentina. No fatalities.

=== Australia ===
- September 24, 1994: L-100-30 (MSN 382-4826) PK-PLV of Heavy lift crashed into water on take-off from Kai Tak Airport, Hong Kong, overspeed on number four propeller. This was the second and last Hercules accident at this airport.
- January 23, 2020: EC-130Q USN 161496 (MSN 382-4904) N134CG of Coulson Aviation (Australia) under contract to the New South Wales Rural Fire Service was destroyed when it crashed near Cooma, New South Wales during operations to fight a bushfire of the 2019–20 Australian bushfires. Three aircrew from the US were killed.

=== Belgium ===
- July 15, 1996: C-130H CH-06 of the Belgian Air Force crashed at Eindhoven AB in Eindhoven, Netherlands. The aircraft was carrying 37 members of the Dutch Army Fanfare Band, two pilots, one engineer and one loadmaster (41 total). The aircraft had departed from Villafranca in Italy. It is believed that the co-pilot initiated a go-around after noticing a flock of birds on the runway. Some were ingested resulting in loss of power on three engines. The aircraft hit the runway and caught fire. 32 people died in the crash and resulting fire. Nine heavily burned survivors were rescued, two of whom later died in hospital. This crash is also known in the Netherlands as the Herculesramp (Hercules disaster).
- May 5, 2006: C-130H CH-02 of the Belgian Air Component was destroyed in hangar fire at Brussels Airport, Belgium, along with three civilian Airbus A320s.

=== Bolivia ===
- September 28, 1979: C-130H CP-1375 of Transporte Aéreo Boliviano flew into water after night take-off from Panama-Tocumen.
- December 21, 1989: C-130A TAM62 of the Bolivian Air Force crashed at Guayaramerin, Bolivia, 700 kilometers north-northeast of La Paz, after three-engine take-off. 22 of the 27 people on board were killed.
- December 31, 1994: C-130B TAM67 of the Bolivian Air Force crashed on three-engine take-off from Trinidad, Bolivia.
- January 14, 2000: C-130B TAM60 of the Bolivian Air Force crashed at Chimorre Airport (Bolivia). The aircraft departed down the left side of runway 35, but 600 meters from the approach end, impacted into a ditch and came to rest in a forested area off the left side of the runway. The aircraft was a total loss with five passengers dead according to information provided in citation.
- February 27, 2026: C-130 FAB-81 of the Bolivian Air Force crashed near El Alto at 18:15 local time (22:15 GMT). The aircraft was carrying banknotes. At least 24 people were killed in the accident. At least 43 were injured.

=== Brazil ===
- October 26, 1966: C-130E 2452 of the Brazilian Air Force (1 Esquadrão, 1 Grupo, Galeão, Rio de Janeiro, Brazil), crashed during landing with a high sink rate.
- December 21, 1969: C-130E 2450 of the Brazilian Air Force (1 Esquadrão, 1 Grupo, Galeão, Rio de Janeiro, Brazil), written off at Recife, Brazil.
- June 24, 1985: C-130E 2457 of the Brazilian Air Force (1 Esquadrão, 1 Grupo, Galeão, Rio de Janeiro, Brazil), crashed in fog on landing approach to Santa Maria Air Force Base, Brazil.
- December 12, 1987: C-130H 2468 of the Brazilian Air Force crashed into sea on approach to Fernando de Noronha island, Brazil. 29 were killed.
- October 14, 1994: C-130E 2460 of the Brazilian Air Force (1 Esquadrão, 1 Grupo) was destroyed at Formosa, 60 kilometers northeast of Brasília, Brazil, when ammunition load caught fire in the air.
- November 27, 2014: C-130H 2470 undershot the runway at Teniente Rodolfo Marsh Martin Air Base (TNM/SCRM), King George Island, Antarctica, hitting a rock out-crop which ripped off the starboard undercarriage legs. The aircraft proceeded down the runway, settling to starboard, when the No. 4 and No. 3 propellers contacted the snow. The aircraft ground-looped to a standstill largely intact. Despite plans to repair the aircraft, it was decided to dismantle it in an environmentally safe method so the parts could be removed to Brazil.

=== Canada ===
- April 15, 1966: CC-130B 10304 of the Royal Canadian Air Force crash landed in a field after losing a forward cargo door inflight, resulting in structural damage due to explosive decompression.
- April 27, 1967: CC-130E 10309 of the RCAF crashed after take-off from Trenton, possibly due to an elevator trim failure.
- July 16, 1969: L-100 CF-PWO of Pacific Western Airlines crashed Cayaya, Peru, wing hit ground during go-around in fog.
- November 21, 1976: L-100-20 CF-PWX of Pacific Western Airlines crashed at Eastville, near Kisangani, Zaire, low fuel, emergency landing in fog at night. Field landing lights off on arrival, not enough fuel to return, let down in jungle, one survivor.
- October 15, 1980: CC-130E 130312 of the Canadian Forces operated by 436 Squadron, stalled at low level and crashed near Chapais, Quebec, while on a Search and Rescue Mission for a lost helicopter.
- April 11, 1982: L-100-20 CF-PWK of Northwest Territorial Airways burned on ground, off-loading gasoline, Paulatuk, Northwest Territories (69N, 124W).
- November 16, 1982: CC-130H 130329 of the Canadian Forces crashed during a Low Altitude Parachute Extraction System (LAPES) operation at Namao when the load failed to clear the aircraft causing it to crash.
- March 29, 1985: Two Canadian Forces CC-130H, 130330 and 130331 both of 435 Squadron, crashed after having a mid-air collision over CFB Namao, near Edmonton, Alberta. This remains the only dual Hercules mid-air collision.
- January 29, 1989: CC-130E 130318 of the Canadian Forces and operated by 435 Squadron when it crashed 600 feet short of the runway during a night approach at −46C, in Fort Wainwright, Alaska.
- October 30, 1991: CC-130E 130322 of the Canadian Forces was flying to Canadian Forces Station (CFS) Alert from Edmonton, Alberta via Thule Air Base, Greenland. While on final approach to the airstrip the pilot apparently was flying by sight rather than relying on instruments. The aircraft crashed on Ellesmere Island approximately 16 km (9.9 miles) short of the runway, killing five of the 18 passengers and crew. Subsequent rescue efforts by personnel from CFS Alert, USAF personnel from Thule AB and CF personnel from 440 Squadron, CFB Edmonton, Alberta, 413 Sqn CFB Greenwood, Nova Scotia and 424 Sqn Trenton, Ontario, were hampered by a blizzard and local terrain. The crash investigation recommended all CC-130s be retrofitted with ground proximity detectors and beefed-up Arctic survival equipment. The crash and rescue efforts were the basis of a film called Ordeal in the Arctic.
- July 22, 1993: CC-130E 130321 of the Canadian Forces and operated by 435 Squadron, Edmonton, Alberta, crashed while performing a low-level practice LAPES drop at CFB Wainwright, Alberta. During the drop the airplane hit a berm and crashed in prairie grassland, breaking up into three pieces. Five of the nine military personnel on board died.
- February 21, 2012: CC-130HT 130342 of the Canadian Forces operated by 435 Squadron, was written off after a fire at FS737 in Key West, Florida. The fire, which was caused by a hydraulic line chaffing on an electrical wire, burnt a hole through the airframe. The aircraft was a total loss and no personnel were injured.

=== Chad ===
- March 7, 1986: C-130A TT-PAB of the Chadian Air Force crashed when it stalled on take-off.
- November 16, 1987: C-130A TT-PAC of the Chadian Air Force crash landed in Chad.
- June 11, 2006: C-130H, TT-PAF of the Chadian Air Force crashed at Abéché, Chad.

=== Chile ===
- December 9, 2019: KC-130R 990 of the Chilean Air Force went missing with 38 passengers on board. The plane was flying to Chile's Base Presidente Eduardo Frei Montalva, on Antarctica's King George Island. See: 2019 Chilean Air Force C-130 disappearance

=== Colombia ===
- August 26, 1969: C-130B FAC1002 of the Colombian Air Force crashed during landing at Bogotá, burned.
- October 16, 1982: C-130B, FAC1003 of the Colombian Air Force ditched in Atlantic Ocean 330 kilometers east of Cape May, New Jersey, navigation systems unserviceable, ran out of fuel – hull floated for 56 hours.
- March 23, 2026: C-130H FAC1016 of the Colombian Air Force crashed during take off at Puerto Leguizamo, killing 69 and injuring 57.

=== Ecuador ===
- May 16, 1968: L-100 N9267R of Alaska Airlines, leased to Aérea-Aerovías Ecuatorianas, burned after propeller struck the ground while taxiing at the airstrip of Macuma, Morona Santiago. No fatalities.
- July 12, 1978: C-130H 748 of the Ecuadorian Air Force and operated by 11 squadron crashed into the eastern slopes of Pichincha Mountains, Ecuador. There were seven fatalities; the plane was transporting general cargo and appliances for the welfare office of the Ecuadorean Air Force.
- April 29, 1982: C-130H 743 of the Ecuadorian Air Force operated by 11 Squadron, crashed into a forested hillside 15 kilometers before the runway of Mariscal Sucre Air Base in Quito, during go-around after missed approach.

=== Egypt ===
- February 19, 1978: C-130H 76-1598 (MSN 382-4704), 1270/SU-BAA of the Egyptian Air Force was destroyed during the Egyptian raid on Larnaca International Airport. All three crew were killed.
- May 29, 1981: C-130H 78-0755 (MSN 382-4792),1276/SU-BAH of the Egyptian Air Force hit ground after take-off from Cairo, killing all 17 on board.
- February 24, 2009: C-130H 76-1600 (MSN 382-4714), 1272/SU-BAC of the Egyptian Air Force crashed during a touch-and-go landing after dark. No one was killed, but the aircraft was written off.
- September 21, 2014: C-130H 78-0766 (MSN 382-4809) 1287/SU-BAT of the Egyptian Air Force crashed during a training flight near Kawm Awshim, Fayoum, killing six of the seven people on board.

=== Ethiopia ===
- September 17, 1991: L-100-30 ET-AJL of Ethiopian Airlines crashed into mountain Arey, south of Djibouti, Ethiopia.
- June 23, 2021: C-130E of the Ethiopian Air Force downed by the Tigray Defense Forces near Gijet, Ethiopia.

=== Greece ===
- February 5, 1991: C-130H 748 of the Hellenic Air Force and operated by 356 Mira, crashed into Mount Othrys during landing approach to Nea Anchialos, 63 dead.
- December 20, 1997: C-130H 750 of the Hellenic Air Force and operated by 356 Mira, crashed into Pastra during landing approach to Tanagra air base.

=== Honduras ===
- August 14, 1986: C-130D 556 of the Honduran Air Force crashed during attempted landing near Wampusirpi, Honduras, killing all 52 people on board. It was suspected that bad weather may have played a part in the crash.

=== India ===
- March 28, 2014: An Indian Air Force as KC-3803 C-130J-30 (MSN 5640) Super Hercules aircraft, one of the six purchased in 2012, crashed near Gwalior in Madhya Pradesh, India, while on a training mission, killing all five on board and destroying the aircraft. The aircraft was conducting low level penetration training by flying at around 300 ft when it ran into wake turbulence, from another aircraft in the formation, which caused it to crash.

=== Indonesia ===
- September 3, 1964: C-130B (MSN 282-3599) T-1307 of the Indonesian Air Force and operated by 31 Squadron crashed into the Straits of Malacca whilst evading interception by a Royal Air Force Javelin FAW.9 of 60 Squadron from RAF Tengah. This was the first non-U.S. Hercules hull loss.
- September 16, 1965: C-130B (MSN 282-3598) T-1306 of the Indonesian Air Force and operated by 31 Squadron crashed at Bawang airstrip, Kalimantan Timur, Borneo, after hits by friendly fire.
- November 21, 1985: C-130MP (MSN 382-4898) A-1322 of the Indonesian Air Force crashed into volcano Mount Sibayak, North Sumatra.
- October 5, 1991: C-130H-30 (MSN 382-4927) A-1324 of the Indonesian Air Force crashed after take-off from Halim Perdanakusuma International Airport, Jakarta, Indonesia, due to an engine fire. 133 on board the aircraft, as well as two people on the ground, were killed, but one passenger on the aircraft survived.
- December 20, 2001: L-100-30 (MSN 382-4824) A-1329 of the Indonesian Air Force written off during landing at Malikus Saleh when it ran off the runway.
- May 20, 2009: L-100-30 (MSN 382-4917) A-1325 of the Indonesian Air Force (31 Squadron) was carrying soldiers and their families when it crashed into homes and erupted in flames, killing at least 98 people. The burning wreckage of the Hercules was scattered in a rice paddy near Magetan, East Java, about 160 kilometers east of Yogyakarta. The plane was carrying more than 100 passengers and crew including soldiers and their families, among them children. It was flying from Jakarta to the eastern province of Papua via Magetan.
- June 30, 2015: KC-130B (MSN 282-3616) A-1310 of the Indonesian Air Force (31 Squadron) with over 110 people on board crashed into a residential area in Medan, Indonesia shortly after leaving Soewondo Air Force Base. All on-board were killed, and more on the ground.
- December 18, 2016: ex-RAAF as A97-005 C-130H. C-130HS (MSN 382-4785) A-1334 of Indonesian Air Force (32 Squadron) crashed into mountainous area while approaching Wamena Airport with over 12 crew and carrying 12 tons of cargo. Two bodies found.

=== Iran ===
- April 18, 1967: C-130E 5-107 of the Imperial Iranian Air Force (5th Air Transport Squadron) crashed due to a lightning strike. All 23 people on board were killed.
- April 7, 1969: C-130E 5-112 of the Imperial Iranian Air Force (5th Air Transport Squadron) crashed at Shiraz, Iran, while simulating two engines out.
- February 28, 1974: C-130E 5-122 of the Imperial Iranian Air Force crashed into mountain near Mehrabad Airport, Iran.
- July 4, 1974: C-130E 5-8507 of the Imperial Iranian Air Force crashed at Shiraz, Iran on date believed to be July 4.
- December 21, 1976: C-130H 5-8336 of the Imperial Iranian Air Force crashed during approach in bad weather to Shiraz, Iran.
- September 19, 1978: C-130H 5-8532 of the Imperial Iranian Air Force crashed during landing, 3-engine go-around, Doshan Tappah Air Base, Iran.
- June 19, 1979: C-130E 5-8520 of the Imperial Iranian Air Force lost control in flight, crashed, Shiraz, Iran. There is some question about this date.
- September 29, 1981: C-130H 5-8552 of the Islamic Republic of Iran Air Force (IRIAF) crashed near Kahrizak, 20 kilometers south of Tehran, killing all 80 on board including Minister of Defence and high-ranking officers including Mohammad Jahanara, one of the main commanders in Battle of Khorramshahr in the Iran–Iraq War.
- November 2, 1986: C-130 of the IRIAF, identity not established, crashed into mountain, killing seven crew, 91 soldiers as passengers, during approach to Zahedan Airport (ZAH/OIZH), Iran.
- March 17, 1994: C-130H 5-8521 of the IRIAF was shot down by Armenian rebels, three kilometers north of Stepanakert, in Nagorno-Karabakh, on flight from Moscow to Tehran. The 32 people (19 women and children and 13 crew) on board were killed in the crash.
- March 13, 1997: Unidentified C-130 of the IRIAF, crashed near Mashad, killing 86.
- February 2, 2000: An unidentified C-130 of the IRIAF collided with an Airbus A300 on take-off for training flight from Tehran–Mehrabad Airport (THR) – lost control and hit empty Iran Air Airbus A300 being towed into hangar. Both hulls burned. Eight on Hercules killed.
- June 25, 2003: An unidentified IRIAF C-130 crashed near Rudshour, Iran during training flight from Tehran–Mehrabad Airport (THR). The aircraft departed Mehrabad Airport at 1225 hrs. local time and crashed 35 minutes later. "Technical failure" – two engines caught fire, seven killed.
- December 6, 2005: C-130E 5-8319 of the IRIAF crashed into a ten-floor apartment building, home to a number of air force personnel, in a residential area of Tehran, Iran. The aircraft was carrying 84 passengers (68 of whom were journalists due to watch military exercises off the country's south coast) and 10 crew members. In all, 106 people died.

=== Israel ===
- November 25, 1975: C-130H 203/4X-FBO of the Israeli Defense Force/Air Force crashed into mountain Jebel Halal, 55 kilometres (34 mi) south-southeast of El Arish, Egypt. Pilots were Shaul Bustan and Uri Manor.

=== Italy ===
- March 3, 1977: C-130H MM61996 of the Italian Air Force (46 Aerobrigata), crashed into Monte Serra, 15 kilometers east of Pisa, Italy.
- January 23, 1979: C-130H MM62000 of the Italian Air Force (46 Aerobrigata) jumped chocks during engine run-up, hit tree, written off.
- November 24, 2009: KC-130J MM62176 of the Italian Air Force crashed on a railway line near Galileo Galilei Airport, Pisa, just after having had a touch-and-go landing on the same airport. All five crew (two pilots and three operators) were killed in the impact.

=== Jordan ===
- July 26, 2000: HC-130H 348 of the Royal Jordanian Air Force crashed after takeoff from al-Mafraq air base, 50 km (31 mi) north of Amman, Jordan, killing all 13 crew members.

=== Kuwait ===
- September 5, 1980: L-100-20 317 of the Kuwait Air Force crashed near Montelimar in southeastern France – lightning strike.
- February 27, 1991: L-100-30 322 of the Kuwait Air Force hit by bomb and center fuselage badly damaged. Transported by road to Kuwait and scrapped in March 1995, scrapped.

=== Libya ===
- April 7, 1979: C-130H 116 of the Libyan Arab Air Force was shot down by an RPG-7 round during take-off from Entebbe International Airport, Uganda, which was subsequently captured by Tanzanian troops during the Battle of Jinja.
- April 29, 2018: A Libyan C-130 chartered by Akakus Oil crashed and exploded shortly after take-off at El Sharara oil field, killing three crew members and injuring a fourth.

=== Malaysia ===
- August 25, 1990: C-130H M30-03 of the Royal Malaysian Air Force crash landing at Sibu, Sarawak.

=== Mexico ===
- September 17, 1999: C-130A 3610 of the Mexican Air Force crashed into mountains, 80 kilometers northeast of Mexico City, Mexico.
- September 19, 2003: C-130A 3603 of the Mexican Air Force crashed near La Quemada, Mexico – in flight fire.

=== Morocco ===
- December 4, 1976: C-130H CN-AOB of the Royal Moroccan Air Force crashed after takeoff from Laayoune when it lost two engines.
- October 12, 1981: C-130H CN-AOH of the Royal Moroccan Air Force shot down over West Sahara by Polisario rebels.
- July 26, 2011: C-130H CNA-OQ of the Royal Moroccan Air Force crashed in southern Morocco, in a mountainous area near the city of Guelmim with 78 fatalities.

=== Niger ===
- April 16, 1997: C-130H 5U-MBD of the Niger Air Force flew into ground at the village of Sorei on approach to Niamey, Niger.

=== Nigeria ===
- September 26, 1992: C-130H 911 of the Nigerian Air Force crashed three minutes after take-off from Lagos, Nigeria, three engines failed, high take-off weight. All 158 people on board were killed, including eight foreign nationals. This crash is the deadliest involving the Lockheed C-130.

=== Norway ===
- March 15, 2012: C-130J-30, 10–5630 of the Norwegian Air Force c/n 5630 crashed on its way from Evenes, Norway to Kiruna, Sweden. The aircraft was to collect soldiers and fly back to the Norwegian base for the NATO exercise "Cold Response".

=== Pakistan ===
- August 18, 1965: C-130B 12648 of the Pakistan Air Force was written off after it veered off runway on landing.
- July 15, 1966: C-130B 24142 of the Pakistan Air Force (6 Squadron) crashed into mountain in Pakistan. All ten aboard killed.
- July 8, 1969: C-130B 24390 of the Pakistan Air Force burned out during refuelling at Islamabad – as of October 1986, hull was on dump at Islamabad.
- March 4, 1970: C-130B 24389 of the Pakistan Air Force (6 Squadron), written off.
- February 1, 1979: C-130B 23488 of the Pakistan Air Force jumped chocks during night engine test run, collided with 10687 and was written off.
- February 1, 1979: C-130E 10687 of the Pakistan Air Force hit by 23488 when it jumped chocks during night engine test run, written off. Hull at Lahore, June 1981.
- August 17, 1988: C-130B 23494 of the Pakistan Air Force crashed shortly after takeoff from Bahawalpur. All on board were killed, including the President of Pakistan, Muhammad Zia-ul-Haq, the US ambassador to Pakistan Arnold Lewis Raphel, US General Herbert M. Wassom, and 17 top ranking Pakistan Army personnel.
- September 10, 1998: Five crewmen (two pilots and three FEs) were killed and four more were injured when a Pakistan Air Force C-130 went out of control after a brake fire and hit a parked C-130 at the PAF Chaklala base. Both aircraft were written off.
- November 9, 2018: C-130 of Pakistan Air Force caught fire after emergency crash landing at PAF Nur Khan Airbase. No casualties are reported, but the aircraft has been damaged beyond repair.

=== Peru ===
- February 19, 1978: L-100-20 FAP-394 of the Peruvian Air Force (FAP) crashed when engine shut down during take-off from Tarapoto, Peru.
- April 24, 1981: L-100-20 FAP-396 of the Peruvian Air Force had an emergency landing at night, no fuel, near San Juan, Peru.
- June 9, 1983: L-100-20 FAP-383 of the Peruvian Air Force crashed into houses when approaching at Puerto Maldonado Airport, southern Peru, killing eight or six crewmen, among them FAP Captain David Abensur Rengifo, as well as one or two people on the ground (depending on the source).

=== Philippines ===
- December 16, 1993: C-130H 4761 of the Philippine Air Force (222 Squadron) crashed into Mount Manase, 250 kilometers southeast of Manila during descent towards Naga Airport.
- August 25, 2008: L-100-20 4593 of the Philippine Air Force (220th Airlift Wing based in Mactan, Cebu), crashed at 2055 hrs. into sea shortly after takeoff in Davao City. The aircraft, built in 1975, had lost contact after taking off from Davao International Airport shortly before midnight. The cause of the crash was unknown. Two pilots, seven crewmen which consists of an Instructor Flight Engineer, student flight engineer, Crew Chief, two Load Masters, one student Load Master and a flight mechanic, and two Scout Rangers were on board when it crashed. Until now the authorities are still solving the plane's mysterious crash.
- March 27, 2019: C-130H 4726 of the Philippine Air Force caught fire while about to take off from Clark Air Base. No fatalities.
- July 4, 2021: C-130H 5125 of the Philippine Air Force carrying 104 people on board crashed in Patikul, Sulu; 50 passengers were killed, while 46 were injured. Three civilians on the ground were killed and four were injured; the total casualties are 53 dead and 50 injured. The cause was cited as a missing of the intended runway; the plane then skidded into a village and burst into flames. The crashed C-130 aircraft is a refurbished unit delivered in January 2021.

=== Poland ===
- February 5, 2010: C-130E 1506 of the Polish Air Force suffered in-flight structural damage and made an emergency landing at Mazar-e Sharif Airfield. The aircraft was written off.

=== Portugal ===
- July 11, 2016: C-130H 16804 of the Portuguese Air Force, with seven persons on board, crashed on Montijo Air Base when its crew lost the control of the aircraft while executing a training exercise of aborting a take-off. Despite no injuries on the crew resulted from the crash itself, a fire broke on the starboard wing and landing gear, which spread to the rest of the aircraft, resulted in three of the crew dead and another seriously injured.

=== São Tomé and Príncipe ===
- April 9, 1989: L-100-20 S9-NAI of Transafrik had a crash landing at Luena, Moxico Province, Angola – fire in two engines.
- December 26, 1998: L-100-30 S9-CAO of Transafrik shot down by UNITA after take-off from Huambo, Angola on UN mission.
- December 27, 1999: L-100-30 S9-NOP of Transafrik ran off wet runway on landing at Luzamba, Angola, went into 40-foot ravine, written off.
- October 12, 2010: L-100-20 5X-TUC of Transafrik was operating Flight 662 when it crashed into a mountain near Pol-e Charki on a flight from Bagram Air Base to Kabul International Airport, Afghanistan, killing all eight crew.

=== Saudi Arabia ===
- January 1, 1969: C-130E (MSN 382-4136) 454 of the Royal Saudi Air Force (4 Squadron), crashed at Le Bourget Airport, Paris, France.
- September 14, 1980: C-130E (MSN 382-4128) 453 of the RSAF (4 Squadron), crashed on take-off from Medina Saudi Arabia – engine fire. 89 on board killed.
- February 24, 1985: KC-130H (MSN 382-4872) 1620 of the RSAF (16 Squadron), crashed at Riyadh, Saudi Arabia, stalled in overshoot turn.
- March 27, 1989: C-130H (MSN 382-4756) 470 of the RSAF (4 Squadron) take-off accident at Jeddah, Saudi Arabia, written off.
- March 21, 1991: C-130 of the RSAF crashed while trying to land at Ras Mishab Airport, Saudi Arabia, 98 of the 101 people on board were killed.

=== South Africa ===
- January 9, 2020: C-130BZ (MSN 282-3750) 403 of the South African Air Force with 59 passengers and eight crew members crash landed at Goma airport in the Democratic Republic of the Congo when the left engine caught fire on landing. Severe damage was caused to the left wing. The aircraft was later written off, and stripped for spare parts.

=== South Vietnam ===
- December 18, 1974: C-130A 56-0521 of the Republic of Vietnam Air Force (VNAF) was destroyed on ground at Song Be, South Vietnam.
- December 25, 1974: C-130A 55-0016 of the VNAF was shot down landing at Song Be, South Vietnam.
- April 6, 1975: C-130A 55-0002 of the VNAF ran off runway at Bien Hoa, South Vietnam, burned.

=== Spain ===
- May 28, 1980: C-130H T.10-1 of the Spanish Air Force (Escuadrón 311) crashed into mountain in central Gran Canaria.

=== Sudan ===
- May 11, 1987: Lars Olausson lists unidentified C-130 of the Sudanese Air Force for this date, but the Aviation Safety database has no matching incident.
- February 8, 1990: Unidentified C-130H of the Sudanese Air Force shot down, all on board killed.
- September 2, 1991: C-130E operated by Southern Air Transport (N521J) taxied over anti-tank mine in Wau, Sudan. No fatalities, but American crew suffered serious injuries.
- July 25, 1992: Unidentified C-130H of the Sudanese Air Force crashed near Juba, Sudan. No other details available.
- February 26, 1996: Unidentified C-130 of the Sudanese Air Force crashed near Jabal Awliya, killing 91.
- June 3, 1999: Lars Olausson lists unidentified C-130 of the Sudanese Air Force loss for this date, but there is no matching incident in the Aviation Safety database.
- March 21, 2024: a Sudanese Air Force C-130H was destroyed by a kamikaze drone operated by the Rapid Support Forces as the aircraft was taxiing on Wadi Seidna Air Base runway.

=== Switzerland ===
- October 14, 1987: L-100-30 HB-ILF of Zimex Aviation was shot down after take-off from Cuito, Angola.

=== Taiwan ===
- October 10, 1997: C-130H 1310 of the Republic of China Air Force crashed during attempted go-around at Songshan Airport in rain storm.

=== Turkey ===
- October 19, 1968: C-130E 64-17949 (MSN 382-4100). (221 Sq.) C-130 as ETI-949 of the Turkish Air Force crashed into mountain on approach to Akhisar AB, Manisa, Turkey. Seven crew killed.
- November 11, 2025: C-130E (MSN 382-4311) to Saudi AF as 1609. Transferred to Turkish AF as 68-1609 in 2012. (222 Sq) C-130E of the Turkish Air Force broke up in mid-air over Signagi Municipality, Georgia. All 20 occupants were killed.

=== United Arab Emirates ===
- August 4, 2008: C-130H 1212 of the United Arab Emirates Air Force overran runway at Bagram Air Base, Kabul, burned.

=== United Kingdom ===
- March 24, 1969: C-130K Hercules C.1 65-13025 (MSN 382-4196)XV180 of the Royal Air Force crashed shortly after takeoff at Fairford in Gloucestershire. The aircraft was on a routine training flight when it stalled on take-off and plunged into a ploughed field 300 yards from the end of the runway, six crew members died.
- November 9, 1971: Hercules C.1 XV216 of the RAF (24 Squadron) crashed into the sea off Pisa with 46 Italian paratroopers on board. There were no survivors.
- September 12, 1972: Hercules C.1 XV194 of the RAF veered off runway on landing at Tromsø/Langnes Airport (TOS), in Norway and ended up in a ditch. The aircraft was damaged beyond repair.
- September 10, 1973: Hercules C.1 XV198 of the RAF (48 Squadron) crashed at RAF Colerne in Wiltshire. It was carrying out co-pilot training when it was overshooting from runway 07 with a simulated engine failure when the other engine on that side failed. At that height (400 ft) and speed involved, the asymmetric forces proved too much for the crew to control and the aircraft dived into the ground. All five crew died.
- June 27, 1985: Hercules C.1P XV206 of the RAF (1312 Flight), collided at about 200–300 ft in cloud with a Royal Navy Westland Sea King HAS5, XZ919, helicopter of 826 Naval Air Squadron, north of the Falkland Islands. The C-130 lost the entire wing outboard of the No. 1 engine but still managed to land. The Sea King was lost and all four on board killed. The Sea King was serving with RNAS Culdrose.
- May 27, 1993: Hercules C.3 XV193 of the RAF crashed at Glen Loch, Blair Atholl, Perthshire, Scotland when it stalled after cargo drop. Eight RAF crew and one Army Air Despatcher on board perished.
- August 4, 1994: A low flying RAF Hercules struck and killed a soldier who was standing on top of an Army truck at South Cerney airfield in Gloucestershire. The Soldier was from RAF Brize Norton and was part of the drop zone recovery party. The aircraft had dropped parachute loads on the airfield and was making a low pass following the final drop.
- June 11, 1999: Hercules C.1 XV298 of the RAF crashed on take-off from Kukës airstrip, Albania when it hit an obstacle on take-off. Fire, written off.
- January 30, 2005: Hercules C.1 XV179 of the RAF crashed with 10 crew on board when it was hit by insurgent fire while en route from Baghdad airport to Balad. A fire triggered by the hit may have induced an explosion in the right hand wing fuel tank.
- May 24, 2006: Hercules C.1 XV206 of the RAF (47 Squadron Special Forces Flight) was carrying the new British ambassador in Afghanistan, Stephen Evans when it crash landed at a dirt landing strip outside the town of Lashkar Gar in Helmand Province, Afghanistan after hitting a landmine on roll-out which holed the port external fuel tank and set the number two (port inner) engine on fire. All nine crew and 26 passengers aboard safely evacuated, but the airframe burned out. It was later revealed that the Hercules was carrying a large number of SAS troops as well as a large amount of cash described as being one million dollars in some sources, and as "more than one million pounds" by others, while the MoD only admitted to a "sizeable amount of cash". The money was apparently destined for local warlords in exchange for their influence and intelligence.
- February 12, 2007: Hercules C.4 ZH876 of the RAF was seriously damaged during a landing incident in the Maysan Province of Iraq near the Iranian border. The aircraft was subsequently destroyed as it was deemed too dangerous for coalition forces to repair and recover it. This was the first C-130J loss for any nationality since the new variant entered service in 1999. Although it is acknowledged that this was not a Special Forces aircraft, it carried secure communications equipment that could not be compromised.
- August 23, 2007: Hercules C.1 XV205 of the RAF landed "very heavily" at night on a rough airstrip in Afghanistan in an area where there was a heavy Taliban presence. The Hercules, from 47 Squadron at RAF Lyneham, flown by a 47 Squadron Special Forces Flight crew, was badly damaged and could not be recovered. It was destroyed in place by British engineers so that sensitive equipment would not fall into enemy hands. No casualties were reported. Aircraft was modified with FLIR turret and night cameras in 2005.
- May 6, 2010: Hercules C.3A XV304 of the RAF made a belly landing at RAF Brize Norton, Oxfordshire. The decision was made not to repair it and its outer wing panels have been removed to replace those of a Hercules C.1 undergoing a major overhaul at Cambridge.
- August 25, 2017: Hercules C.4 ZH873 was written off after a heavy landing at a temporary landing zone during Operation Shader, during an apparent special forces mission.

=== United States ===
==== 1950s ====
- September 2, 1958: C-130A-II, 56-0528 of the United States Air Force (7406th Support Squadron) was shot down by four MiG-17 fighters of the 25th Fighter Air Regiment when it flew into Soviet airspace over 34 km. NW Yerevan, Armenia while on a Sun Valley SIGINT mission, with all 17 crew killed. The navigational error was due to locking on to the wrong radio beacon. A look-alike C-130A is displayed in Vigilance Park at the National Security Agency headquarters at Fort George G. Meade, Maryland. This was the first operational C-130 hull loss.
- September 19, 1958: C-130A 56-0526 of the USAF (317th Troop Carrier Wing at Évreux AB, France), had a mid-air collision with a French Armée de l'Air Dassault Super Mystère over Paris, France. Six crew killed (C-130). One crew killed (Dassault Super Mystère).
- May 20, 1959: C-130A 57-0468 of the USAF (815th Troop Carrier Squadron, 463d Troop Carrier Wing), crashed at Ashiya, Japan when it lost control during landing with single-engine failure. One crew killed, nine ground personnel killed.

==== 1960s ====
- May 27, 1961: A Tactical Air Command C-130B 59-1534, c/n 3570, of the 773d Troop Carrier Squadron, veered off the runway during landing at Ramstein Air Base, West Germany, with single-engine failure.
- October 1961: United States Air Forces Europe C-130A 58-0745, c/n 3543 of the 322d Air Division was damaged in a fire during maintenance at Évreux-Fauville Air Base, France, and written off. Front portion towed to Spangdahlem Air Base, West Germany, to repair C-130A 58-0734, c/n 3530, in October 1969.
- Exact date unknown, c.1962 US C-130 crashed in Iran along the Iran-Turkey-Soviet Union border in the Zagros Mountains, bodies and classified material were recovered by US Army Special Forces under command of Lauri Törni, who "led his detachment onto the highest mountain in Iran" in the recovery operation.
- March 8, 1962: C-130A 55-0020, c/n 3047, of the 322d Air Division, crashed 11 km from North Alençon, France in bad weather. 13 crew and two passengers killed.
- May 17, 1962: C-130A 56-0546, c/n 3154, of the 40th Troop Carrier Squadron, 322d Air Division, crashed into mountain peak near Nairobi, Kenya in bad weather after it descended under given altitude. Six crew and seven passengers killed.
- November 26, 1962: C-130A 56-0488, c/n 3096, of the 4442nd Combat Crew Training Squadron, crashed on go-around at Sewart Air Force Base, Tennessee, during a training flight – lost two engines. Five crew killed.
- August 27, 1963: C-130A 56-0474, c/n 3082, of the 315th Air Division, burned at Naha Air Base, Okinawa, during refuelling.
- May 2, 1964: C-130A 56-0492, c/n 3100, of the 315th Air Division, crashed on landing at Ie Shima Island, Japan, when it hit the edge of the runway. Fuselage to Sukiran for paratrooper training.
- January 11, 1965: During an engine run-up test at Forbes Air Force Base, Kansas, a C-130B 58-0719, c/n 3514, of the 313th Troop Carrier Wing, jumped the wheel chocks and pivoted into C-130B 58-0730, c/n 3525, of the same squadron. Both airframes were destroyed in the ensuing fire. This was the first of five recorded cases of Hercules fratricide, as of March 2010.
- March 25, 1965: C-130E 63-7797, c/n 3863, of the 464th Troop Carrier Wing, hit high-tension line on ridge top and crashed near Alençon, France, killing all seven crew.
- April 24, 1965: C-130A 57-0475, c/n 3182, of the 815th Troop Carrier Squadron, crashed at Korat Royal Thai Air Force Base, Thailand, during go-around in bad weather with heavy load – lost two engines, low fuel. This was the first Hercules hull loss related to the war in Southeast Asia. Six killed.
- July 1, 1965: C-130A 55-0039, c/n 3066, of the 817th Troop Carrier Squadron, was destroyed by sappers with satchel charges at Da Nang Air Base, South Vietnam.
- July 1, 1965: C-130A 55-0042, c/n 3069, of the 817th Troop Carrier Squadron, was destroyed by sappers with satchel charges at Da Nang Air Base, South Vietnam.
- August 24, 1965: USMC KC-130F BuNo 149802, c/n 3693, of VMGR-152, MAG-15, veered off runway on take-off from Kai Tak Airport, Hong Kong and hit seawall, and crashed into the sea. No. 1 propeller reversed. This was the first Hercules hull loss in Marine Corps service. It was carrying Marine personnel returning to Vietnam after R & R in Hong Kong – of six crew and 65 passengers, 59 were killed while flying. Aircraft commander disregarded SOP. This is the worst accident at Kai Tak. The airport was relocated to Chek Lap Kok in 1998.
- September 18, 1965: C-130A 55-0038, c/n 3065, of the 35th Troop Carrier Squadron, crashed when it struck water before landing at Qui Nhơn, South Vietnam. (Lars Olausson, "Lockheed Hercules Production List, 1954–2008, 25th edition", page 7). According to Chris Hobson's "Vietnam Air Losses", page 52, the crew was attempting a VFR approach in low cloud and rain but the aircraft hit the water as it rolled out of a turn. Two crew and two passengers killed, three crew survived. Qui Nhơn airfield became notorious for tricky crosswind conditions.
- December 8, 1965: C-130A 56-0502, c/n 3110, of the 817th Troop Carrier Squadron, 6315th Operations Group, out of Naha, crashed on take-off from Chu Lai, South Vietnam in bad weather – engine problems. All five crew survive.
- December 12, 1965: C-130A 56-0515, c/n 3123, of the 18th Troop Carrier Squadron, crashed during an assault take-off from Bitburg, West Germany.
- December 20, 1965: C-130E 62-1843, c/n 3805, of the 345th Troop Carrier Squadron, 314th Troop Carrier Wing, crashed into hill during approach to Tuy Hoa Air Base, South Vietnam, according to Lars Olausson. Chris Hobson gives the following account: "...the first Hercules assumed to be lost in the air to enemy action [in Southeast Asia]. The aircraft was attempting to land at Tuy Hoa under a very low cloud base when it was hit by ground fire five miles south of the air base and crashed killing all [five] crew...Enemy action was never actually confirmed to have caused the loss of this aircraft which may have simply flown into high ground in poor visibility." (Vietnam Air Losses, Page 44). Serial number subsequently assigned to C-130E 64-0506, c/n 3990 in 1973, which was assigned "to another agency" December 31, 1964, and flew Air America missions in support of Central Intelligence Agency (CIA) operations in Southeast Asia in a "sanitized" condition. Modified to C-130E(I). Reappeared at Hurlburt Field, Florida in the early 1970s, carrying 62–1843 identity, as C-130E(I), redesignated MC-130E in early 1977. Assigned to the 711th Special Operations Squadron at Duke Field, Eglin Air Force Base Aux. Field 3, in October 1995, c/n 3990, the faux 62-1843, was still there as of December 2005. The builders plate reads what the Air Force wants it to read, but the airframe hours tell no lies, and the identity is an open secret on the flightline. Seen at Eglin AFB with no markings aside from serials, February 2009.
- January 6, 1966: C-130B 61-0972, c/n 3669, of the 463d Troop Carrier Wing, carrying a load of ammunition, was shot down west of Pleiku, South Vietnam while en route from the US Army's 1st Air Cavalry base at An Khê to Pleiku.
- January 9, 1966: C-130B 61-0970, c/n 3667, of the 774th Troop Carrier Squadron, 314th Troop Carrier Wing, crashed on landing at An Khê, South Vietnam – number three propeller did not reverse and airframe ran off runway. All five crew survived.
- February 1, 1966: USMC KC-130F BuNo 149809, c/n 3709, of VMGR-152, damaged over North Vietnam, crashed in sea 65 kilometers east of Đồng Hới. Six crew lost, although it was always reported to members of VMGR-152 that 3709 reported "strange lights" on Tiger Island, that they were going down to investigate and were never heard from again. Furthermore, the oral history reports that while there was never any debris sighted, an oil slick was.
- March 19, 1966: The crew of seven was killed when C-130B 61-2641, c/n 3677, of the 313th Troop Carrier Wing, crashed into Svanfjellet at 2,650 feet on the island of Senja on approach to Bardufoss Air Station, Norway.
- March 26, 1966: C-130A 56-0506, c/n 3114, of the 41st Troop Carrier Squadron, damaged landing at Tuy Hoa, South Vietnam, due to propeller reversal problem. Swerved into ditch to avoid truck at end of runway. Crew survived. Destroyed when towed by tank. Fuselage adapted for use as Officers Club building at Tuy Hoa.
- March 29, 1966: C-130B 61-0953, c/n 3630, of the 29th Troop Carrier Squadron, written off after it touched down short of the runway during night landing at Pleiku, South Vietnam. Three crew killed, two survived.
- May 31, 1966: C-130E 64-0511, c/n 3995, of the 61st Troop Carrier Squadron, 64th Troop Carrier Wing, shot down during Project Carolina Moon operation against the Thanh Hóa Bridge on the Song Ma River, North Vietnam. Crew of eight KIA when Hercules attempted to drop an 8-foot-diameter (2.4 m) bomb containing 5,000 lbs. of explosives on the rail bridge but exploded a few miles north of the target, assumed to have been either shot down or suffered controlled flight into terrain.
- June 17, 1966: USAF Military Airlift Command C-130E 63-7785, c/n 3852, operated by U.S. Navy squadron VR-7 under MAC control, out of Naval Air Station Moffett, California, exploded over sea after departing Cam Ranh Bay, Republic of Vietnam. Chris Hobson reported in his volume "Vietnam Air Losses" (Midland Publishing, 2001) on page 62 that "(t)he aircraft came down about 45 miles northeast of Nha Trang and about five miles off a small spit of land south of Phú Hiệp. Although very little of the aircraft was ever found it was strongly suspected that the aircraft had been a victim of sabotage by Vietnamese communist sympathisers who worked at the base." This was the first Navy operated Hercules to be lost, but it was on loan from an Air Force unit. Serial number subsequently applied to C-130E 64-0507, c/n 3991, in 1972, which was assigned "to another agency" December 31, 1964, and flew Air America missions in support of CIA operations in Southeast Asia in a "sanitized" condition. Operated into Laos in all-black scheme. Operated by the 1198th OETS out of Norton Air Force Base (from October 1967), and modified to C-130E(I) Combat Talon, then assigned to the 1174th Support Squadron, Norton Air Force Base. To 1st Special Operations Squadron, Hurlburt Field, Florida, December 1972, now sporting the 63-7785, c/n 3852, identity. Modified to Rivet Yank in 1974, and redesignated MC-130E in early 1977. Ops by the 8th Special Operations Squadron, Hurlburt Field, Florida, mid-1995, then to 711th Special Operations Squadron, Duke Field, Florida by November 1995. Loan to 8th Special Operations Squadron, as of November 2005.
- September 6, 1966: C-130E 63-7878, c/n 3949, of the 776th Troop Carrier Squadron, 314th Troop Carrier Wing, out of Ching Chuan Kang crashed into a mountain in Taiwan due to a navigation error during logistics flight from Southeast Asia. Five crew and three passengers killed.
- October 2, 1966: C-130E 62-1840, c/n 3803, of the 776th Troop Carrier Squadron, shot down 30 kilometers south of Cam Ranh Bay, South Vietnam.
- October 12, 1966: C-130E 63-7886, c/n 3957, of the 516th Troop Carrier Wing, flew into ground at night c. 30 kilometers north-northwest of Aspermont, Texas. It impacts in a brushy pasture on the 6666 Ranch, 75 miles NW of Abilene, near US 83. Only one of the crew of six survives, a loadmaster, who is pulled from the wreckage by a passing truck driver, Carroll Brezee. He was in critical condition. The fuselage and tail section lay near the center of a burned area about 50 X 200 yards, with parts scattered along a half-mile stretch. Sheriff E. W. Hollar, of Guthrie, nine miles N of the crash site, said that persons first reaching the scene found two bodies. A ground party from Dyess AFB found the other three in a search through heavy mesquite brush. Authorities said that these were the first fatalities in the 516th Troop Carrier Wing since it was formed at Dyess in December 1958.
- October 25, 1966: C-130B 61-0955, c/n 3634, of the 48th Troop Carrier Squadron, ran off runway during landing at Fort Campbell, Kentucky after hitting wake turbulence – written off.
- February 17, 1967: C-130B 60-0307, c/n 3618, of the 773d Troop Carrier Squadron, crashed after take-off from Tay Ninh, South Vietnam, after suffering split flap problem. Emergency landing in rice paddy, written off.
- March 2, 1967: C-130B 61-952, of the 463D Troop Carrier Wing, crashed under enemy fire near Da Nang, one survivor Clarence Knepler
- March 12, 1967: C-130E 63-7772, c/n 3838, of the 345th Troop Carrier Squadron, crashed on take-off from An Khe, South Vietnam – disturbance by helicopter.
- April 16, 1967: C-130B 58-0722, c/n 3517, of the 29th Troop Carrier Squadron, 463d Troop Carrier Wing, crashed on go-around at Bảo Lộc, South Vietnam – ammunition load exploded.
- June 9, 1967: C-130B 58-0737, c/n 3534, of the 29th Troop Carrier Squadron, crashed 20 kilometers east of Tan Son Nhut, South Vietnam. Structural failure, probably shot down.
- June 17, 1967: C-130B 60-0293, c/n 3591, of the 772nd Troop Carrier Squadron, overran the runway at An Khe, South Vietnam on aborted take-off, written off.
- June 22, 1967: C-130E 63-7801, c/n 3867, of the 777th Tactical Airlift Squadron, tore off wing on landing at Pope Air Force Base, North Carolina, written off. Fuselage to paratrooper training, Fort Bragg, North Carolina, then to loadmaster training at Little Rock Air Force Base, Arkansas, November 1971. Scrapped 1999.
- July 15, 1967: C-130A 55-0009, c/n 3036, of the 41st Troop Carrier Squadron, destroyed by mortar attack, Da Nang Air Base, South Vietnam.
- July 15, 1967: EC-130E 62-1815, c/n 3777, of the 7th Airborne Command and 9Control Squadron, destroyed by mortar attack, Da Nang Air Base, South Vietnam.
- October 8, 1967: C-130B 61-2649, c/n 3692, of the 773d Troop Carrier Squadron, 463d Troop Carrier Wing, hit mountain 25 kilometers southeast of Huế/Phu Bai, South Vietnam.
- October 12, 1967: C-130A 57-0467, c/n 3174, of the 21st Troop Carrier Squadron, hit bulldozer during take-off from Đắk Tô, South Vietnam – landed at Cam Ranh Bay, written off.
- October 15, 1967: C-130E 64-0548, c/n 4043, of the 62nd Tactical Airlift Squadron, crashed short of the runway at Khe Sanh, South Vietnam – too low on the GCA approach to execute airdrop.
- November 15, 1967: C-130E 62-1865, c/n 3829, of the 776th Tactical Airlift Squadron, destroyed in rocket attack at Đắk Tô, South Vietnam.
- November 15, 1967: C-130E 63-7827, c/n 3904, of the 776th Tactical Airlift Squadron, destroyed in rocket attack at Đắk Tô, South Vietnam.
- November 25, 1967: C-130E(I) Combat Talon 64-0563, c/n 4071, of Detachment 1, 314th Tactical Airlift Wing, destroyed in mortar attack at Nha Trang, South Vietnam.
- December 29, 1967: C-130E(I) Combat Talon 64-0547, c/n 4040, of Detachment 1, 314th Tactical Airlift Wing, crashed into mountain 65 kilometers northeast of Dien Bien Phu, after dropping leaflets. Only combat loss of a C-130E (I)/MC-130.
- February 18, 1968: C-130B 58-0743, c/n 3540, of the 772nd Troop Carrier Squadron, destroyed in mortar attack at Tan Son Nhut Air Base, South Vietnam. Round entered through overhead escape hatch.
- February 29, 1968: C-130E 64-0522, c/n 4006, of the 776th Tactical Airlift Squadron, hit by ground fire on take-off from Song Ba, South Vietnam, returned, crash landed and burned. Crew of five and five passengers escaped. Pilot Major Leland R. Filmore awarded a Silver Star for his part in this event. Chris Hobson's Vietnam Air Losses gives the date as February 28, 1968, page 139.
- March 2, 1968: C-130A 56-0549, c/n 3157, of the 21st Tactical Airlift Squadron, crashed during night landing at Huế/Phu Bai, South Vietnam.
- March 3, 1968: C-130E 62-1814, c/n 3776, of the 50th Tactical Airlift Squadron, crashed at Cam Ranh Bay, South Vietnam – electrical fire in aft cockpit. All six crew survive.
- April 13, 1968: C-130B 61-0967, c/n 3654, of the 774th Tactical Airlift Squadron, crashed at Khe Sanh, South Vietnam, suffered engine failure on landing, slid off runway, burned.
- April 16, 1968: C-130A 56-0480, c/n 3088, of the 35th Tactical Airlift Squadron, crash landed at Special Forces Camp Bunard, 80 kilometers north of Bien Hoa, South Vietnam. Hull blown-up.
- April 26, 1968: C-130B 60-0298, c/n 3602, of the 773d Tactical Airlift Squadron, shot down dropping load at A Loui, South Vietnam. Crashed trying to land at A Loui. Crewed by personnel from the 29th and 772nd Tactical Airlift Squadrons.
- May 12, 1968: C-130A 56-0548, c/n 3156, of the 21st Tactical Airlift Squadron, damaged by small arms fire at Kham Duc, South Vietnam – crash landed on runway with all props feathered, brakes shot out, written off.
- May 12, 1968: C-130B 60-0297, c/n 3600, of the 773d Tactical Airlift Squadron, shot down on take-off from Kham Duc, South Vietnam. All 155 people on board were killed.
- May 15, 1968: C-130E 63-7875, c/n 3945, of the 29th Military Airlift Squadron, hard landing at Quảng Trị, South Vietnam, port wing broke, written off.
- May 22, 1968: C-130A 56-0477, c/n 3085, of the 41st Tactical Airlift Squadron, shot down over Laos, during Blind Bat flare operation. First Hercules lost in/over Laos.
- June 25, 1968: C-130E 62-1861, c/n 3825, with the 50th Troop Carrier Squadron from December 1965, from Tuy Hoa departed Katum Camp, took .50 calibre AAA fire which set number one (port outer) engine afire which spread along port wing. Crash landed at Tay Ninh, South Vietnam, with only nose and port landing gear extended, veered off runway, exploded and burned. Crew of five escaped through cockpit overhead hatch and survived.
- July 29, 1968: HC-130P 66-0214, c/n 4164, of the 39th Aerospace Rescue and Recovery Squadron, destroyed by satchel charges at Tuy Hoa, South Vietnam.
- July 29, 1968: HC-130P 66-0218, c/n 4174, of the 39th Aerospace Rescue and Recovery Squadron, destroyed by satchel charges at Tuy Hoa, South Vietnam.
- September 6, 1968: C-130E 62-1785, c/n 3730, of the 314th Tactical Airlift Wing, shot down at Tan Phat, near Bảo Lộc, South Vietnam.
- November 28, 1968: C-130B 61-2644, c/n 3682, of the 772nd Troop Carrier Squadron, crashed when it overran runway during short field landing, Tonie Cham, South Vietnam.
- December 24, 1968: L-100 c/n 4229, delivered October 1967, to Airlift International, registered N760AL; leased to United States Department of the Interior, crashed at Prudhoe Bay, Alaska on go-around in a snowstorm.
- January 27, 1969: C-130E 63-7780, c/n 3846, of the 776th Tactical Airlift Squadron, destroyed in night mortar attack at Tonie Cham, South Vietnam. Aircraft had been assigned as Thunderbirds demonstration team support craft, October 1966.
- February 4, 1969: HC-130H 65-0990, c/n 4151, of the 57th Aerospace Rescue and Recovery Squadron, ditches off Taiwan while locating survivors from sunk freighter.
- March 8, 1969: C-130E 64-0545, c/n 4035, of the 50th Troop Carrier Squadron, crashed short of the runway at Ching Chuan Kang Air Base, Taiwan – weather below minimums.
- April 29, 1969: C-130B 61-2637, c/n 3673, of the 29th Tactical Airlift Squadron, hit in wheel well, crash landed at Lộc Ninh, South Vietnam, burned.
- May 18, 1969: USMC KC-130F BuNo 149814, c/n 3723, of VMGR-152, collided head-on with F-4B BuNo 151001 of VMFA-542, MAG-13, from Chu Lai (both crew killed), while refuelling two F-4Bs of VMFA-314 over South Vietnam near Phu Bai. Two crew of F-4B BuNo 151450, survived after jettisoning bombs and ejecting, while the second F-4B recovered safely to Chu Lai. Olausson states that the KC-130F was from VMGR-352, while Hobson claims it was assigned to VMGR-152.
- May 23, 1969: A drunken U.S. Air Force assistant crew chief, Sgt. Paul Adams Meyer, 23, of Poquoson, Virginia, suffering anxiety over marital problems, started up a Lockheed C-130E Hercules, 63-7789, c/n 3856, of the 36th Tactical Airlift Squadron, 316th Tactical Airlift Wing, on hardstand 21 at RAF Mildenhall and took off in it at 0655 hrs. CET, headed for Langley AFB, Virginia. At least two North American F-100 Super Sabres of the 493d Tactical Fighter Squadron, RAF Lakenheath, a C-130 from Mildenhall, and two RAF English Electric Lightnings were sent aloft to try to make contact with the stolen aircraft. The Hercules flew over the Thames estuary and headed south toward Brighton. After flying over the English Channel, Meyer turned northwest. North of Cherbourg he changed direction, heading south to a point 30 miles north of Alderney. The Hercules crashed into the English Channel off Alderney (5000N, 0205W) ~90 minutes later. In the last transmission from Meyer, to his wife, in a link-up over the side-band radio, he stated, "Leave me alone for about five minutes, I've got trouble." There was speculation whether the Hercules was shot down. Some wreckage was recovered but the assistant crew chief's body was never found. Meyer had been arrested for being drunk and disorderly earlier in the morning in the village of Freckenham and had been remanded to quarters, but snuck out to steal the Hercules.
- May 24, 1969: AC-130A 54-1629, c/n 3016, of the 16th Special Operations Squadron, named "The Arbitrator", suffered battle damage over Laos, crash landed at Ubon Royal Thai Air Force Base, Thailand, burned. First Hercules gunship loss.
- May 27, 1969: C-130A 56-0472, c/n 3080, of the 21st Tactical Airlift Squadron, hit by ground fire while landing at Katum, South Vietnam, starboard wing burned off in post-landing fire.
- May 30, 1969: C-130E 62-1831, c/n 3794, of the 314th Tactical Airlift Wing, to Fairchild Maintenance Facility, St. Petersburg, Florida, written off in ground accident.
- June 23, 1969: C-130B 61-0965, c/n 3652, of the 773d Tactical Airlift Squadron, shot down on approach to Katum Camp, South Vietnam.
- October 6, 1969: C-130B 58-0718, c/n 3513, of the 774th Tactical Airlift Squadron, suffered mid-air explosion near Chu Lai, South Vietnam, during flight to Da Nang – sabotage?
- November 24, 1969: C-130A 56-0533, c/n 3141, of the 41st Tactical Airlift Squadron, shot down at Ban Salou, Laos, during Blind Bat flare operation.
- December 13, 1969: C-130A 56-0499, c/n 3107, of the 41st Tactical Airlift Squadron, crashed during 3-engine take-off from Bù Đốp, South Vietnam.
- December 15, 1969: C-130E 62–1800, c/n 3754, of the 50th Tactical Airlift Squadron, crashed, Taiwan, propeller reversed in flight.

==== 1970s ====
- April 10, 1970: C-130A 56-0510, c/n 3118, of E Flight, 21st Tactical Airlift Squadron, crashed into mountain on approach to Long Tieng, Laos, flown by Air America crew, nine killed.
- April 10, 1970: C-130A 56-0516, c/n 3124, of the 317th Tactical Airlift Wing, ditched, broke up in the Pacific Ocean off Okinawa – bleed air problem, lost two engines.
- April 22, 1970: AC-130A 54-1625, c/n 3012, of the 16th Special Operations Squadron, named "War Lord", shot down over the Ho Chi Minh trail, near Ban Tang Lou.
- July 30, 1970: USMC KC-130F, BuNo 150685, c/n 3728, of VMGR-352, crashed at Marine Corps Air Station El Toro, Lake Forest, California during misjudged maximum effort landing – wings broke, fuselage ended up overturned, burned.
- July 31, 1970: C-130E 62-1802, c/n 3756, of the 4442nd Combat Crew Training Group, crashed on training flight near Piggott, Arkansas, mission included stalls.
- October 2, 1970: C-130E 64-0536, c/n 4025, of the 776th Tactical Airlift Squadron, crashed into Cha Tien Shan mountain after take-off from Taipei, Taiwan.
- October 11, 1970: L-100 c/n 4221, delivered July 1967 as Lockheed Aircraft Service Company N9248R; leased to Alaska Airlines, November 1968 – November 1969, then modified to L-100-20. Sold to Saturn Airways, October 1970. Crashed at Fort Dix in bad weather on approach to McGuire Air Force Base, New Jersey. All three crew were employees of Airlift International, Miami, Florida. KWF were Capt. H. Miller, co-pilot L. Hoffman, and engineer J. Marin.
- February 15, 1971: USN LC-130F BuNo 148318, c/n 3562, of VXE-6, named "City of Christchurch", hit snow wall while taxiing at McMurdo, Antarctica, when wing hit ground, broke, burned. This was the first USN Hercules written off.
- February 21, 1971: C-130B 61-2642, c/n 3678, of the 463d Tactical Airlift Wing, damaged in rocket attack at Da Nang Air Base, South Vietnam. Written off and tail used to repair AC-130A.
- November 12, 1971: C-130E 69-6578, c/n 4353, of the 61st Tactical Airlift Squadron, crashed due to fin stall on take-off from Little Rock Air Force Base, Arkansas.
- December 4, 1971: LC-130F 148321 "Juliet Delta 321", crashed on takeoff from the polar plateau when JATO bottles separated and struck a propeller.
- January 15, 1972: USMC KC-130F BuNo 149810, c/n 3710, of VMGR-252, burned while filled with oxygen, Lake City, Florida. Tail section at Marine Corps Air Station Cherry Point, North Carolina, as of August 1984.
- January 15, 1972: USN EC-130G TACAMO III, BuNo 151890, c/n 3871, of VQ-4, suffered in-flight fire in number one fuel tank, written off at Naval Air Station Patuxent River.
- February 19, 1972: C-130E 62-1813, c/n 3775, of the 16th Tactical Airlift Training Squadron, mid-air collision with Cessna T-37, 6 kilometers northeast of Little Rock, Arkansas – four killed on Hercules.
- March 28, 1972: AC-130A 55-0044, c/n 3071, of the 16th Special Operations Squadron, named "Prometheus", shot down by SA-2 Guideline SAM, southeast of Sepone, Laos.
- March 30, 1972: AC-130E 69-6571, c/n 4345, of the 16th Special Operations Squadron, shot down over the Ho Chi Minh trail, Laos, the second AC-130 lost in three days, and the first E-model gunship attrited. This second loss in three days alarmed Special Operations Command, and led to a review of operational parameters.
- April 18, 1972: C-130E 63-7775, c/n 3841, of the 374th Tactical Airlift Wing, shot down, crashed in rice paddy near Lai Khe, South Vietnam. All crew members survived, Written off.
- April 25, 1972: C-130E 64-0508, c/n 3992, of the 50th Tactical Airlift Squadron, 374th Tactical Airlift Wing, shot down near drop zone at An Lộc, South Vietnam, during night mission.
- May 3, 1972: C-130E 62-1797, c/n 3748, of the 50th Tactical Airlift Squadron, 374th Tactical Airlift Wing, shot down at An Lộc, South Vietnam, during night mission.
- May 17, 1972: C-130E 63-7798, c/n 3864, of the 776th Tactical Airlift Squadron, hit by rocket (?) taking off from Kon Tum, South Vietnam.
- May 22–23, 1972: C-130E 62-1854, c/n 3818, of E flight, 21st Tactical Airlift Squadron, destroyed by rocket on ground at Kon Tum, South Vietnam.
- June 5, 1972: C-130D 57-0495, c/n 3202, of the 17th Tactical Airlift Squadron, named "The Harker", stalled while overshooting at Dye III, 320 kilometers east of Söndreström Air Base, Greenland – rudder stall during flat side-slipping turn. Written off.
- June 5, 1972: C-130E 62-1805, c/n 3759, of the 37th Tactical Airlift Squadron, loaned to the 374th Tactical Airlift Wing – crashed in sea near Makung, Pescadores Islands, after suffering landing gear explosion while in traffic pattern. Pilot retracted landing gear while brake assembly was overheated. Denied sufficient cooling air after retraction into well, the port aft wheel assembly exploded damaging wheel well bulkhead, rupturing several hydraulic lines, the fluid from which was then ignited by the hot components resulting in loss of control of the aircraft.
- June 18, 1972: AC-130A 55-0043, c/n 3070, of the 16th Special Operations Squadron, shot down by SA-7 Man-portable air-defense system, over the A Shau Valley, southwest of Huế, South Vietnam.
- August 12, 1972: C-130E 62-1853, c/n 3817, of the 776th Tactical Airlift Squadron, shot down during take-off from Sóc Trăng, South Vietnam.
- December 5, 1972: C-130E(I) Combat Talon 64-0558, c/n 4059, of the 318th Special Operations Squadron, collided at night with Convair F-102A 56-1517, out of McEntire Air National Guard Base, northeast of Myrtle Beach Air Force Base, South Carolina. Twelve on Hercules, and one in the Delta Dagger KWF.
- December 9, 1972: C-130E 64-0505, c/n 3989, of the 50th Tactical Airlift Squadron, 374th Tactical Airlift Wing, crashed and burned, landing at Naval Air Station Agana/Brewer Field, Guam.
- December 21, 1972: AC-130A 56-0490, c/n 3098, of the 16th Special Operations Squadron, named "Thor", shot down 40 kilometers northeast of Pakse, Laos.
- January 28, 1973: USN LC-130R BuNo 155917, c/n 4305, of VXE-6, crash landing at South Pole Station, Antarctica – late go-around in white-out conditions.
- October 15, 1973: USAF C-130E, 62-1845, c/n 3808, of the 62nd Tactical Airlift Squadron, 314th Tactical Airlift Wing, crashed on the north side of Sugarloaf Mountain, 20 miles (45 kilometers) south of Fort Smith, Arkansas. The aircraft exploded on impact and was destroyed by fire. All seven crew were killed.
- April 20, 1974: USAF C-130E, 62-1841, c/n 3804, of the 776th Tactical Airlift Squadron, 374th Tactical Airlift Wing, crashed on take-off from Andersen Air Force Base, Guam, and sank in the Pacific Ocean.
- May 23, 1974: L-100 c/n 4225, delivered September 1967, as Lockheed Aircraft Services, N759AL, modified to L-100-20, August 1969, sold to Saturn Airways, N14ST, named "Bozo", October 1970. Modified to L-100-30, February 1972. Wing broke in turbulence at Springfield, Illinois.
- August 30, 1974: L-100 c/n 4209, delivered April 1967 to the Government of Zambia, 9J-REZ, leased to Zambian Air Cargoes, April 1967. Sold to National Aircraft Leasing, April 1969, registered N921NA (in an FAA series usually assigned to aircraft of the National Aeronautics and Space Administration), leased to the United States Department of the Interior, April 1969 – July 1972. Leased to Alaska International Air (earlier Interior Airways, later Markair), registered N100AK, July 1972. Damaged on ice island T-3, 1,000 kilometers north of Point Barrow, Alaska, February 1973, repaired. Sold by insurance company to Alaska International Air. Destroyed when cargo exploded on ground at Galbraith Lake, Alaska, 200 kilometers south of Prudhoe Bay.
- September 30, 1974: C-130E 63-7802, c/n 3868, of the 345th Tactical Airlift Squadron, crashed on landing at Kadena Air Base, Japan. Failure of throttle cable on number four engine was determined to be the cause of the accident. All five flight deck crew members survived by exiting through the pilot and copilot's swing windows. Loadmaster exited through rear troop door. No fatalities.
- October 12, 1974: WC-130H 65-0965, c/n 4106, callsign "SWAN 38", built as HC-130H, delivered August 1965, to 48th ARRSq, November 1965; to 79th ARRSq, July 1966; to 36th ARRSq, December 1970; back to 79th ARRSq, 1971. Modified to WC-130H, 1974, assigned to the 54TH WRS, 1974. Disappeared in Taiwan Strait in Typhoon Bess, October 13, 1974.
- October 27, 1974: L-100 c/n 4234, delivered February 1969, sold to National Aircraft Leasing, leased to Interior Airways, N7999S, April 1969. Leased to Delta Air Lines, line number 300, January 1970. Leased to International Aerodyne, February 1971, then leased to Alaska International Air, registered N102AK, July 1972, but still marked N7999S, May 1974. Wing broke on approach to Old Man's Camp, Alaska. Accident report identifies airframe as N102AK.
- February 1, 1975: Tactical Air Command C-130B, 58-0721, c/n 3516, of the 706th Tactical Airlift Squadron, 926th Tactical Airlift Group, 442nd Tactical Airlift Wing, tailcode NO, Naval Air Station New Orleans, Louisiana, 1974–1975, crashed on take-off from New Orleans – number one engine failed.
- April 28, 1975: C-130E 72-1297, c/n 4519, of the 314th Tactical Airlift Wing, destroyed by 122 mm rocket, Tan Son Nhut Air Base, South Vietnam. After off-loading a BLU-82, it was hit while taxiing to pick up evacuees. This was the last U.S. military Hercules hull loss associated with the war in Southeast Asia. It was these attacks by the advancing NVA that forced the closing of Tan Son Nhut to fixed-wing evacuation, thus necessitating the now-famous helicopter evacuations from downtown Saigon by the United States Marine Corps and the Air America arm of the CIA. See Operation Frequent Wind.
- July 26, 1975: C-130A 57-0454, c/n 3161, of the 63rd Tactical Airlift Squadron, crashed north of Imlay City, Michigan – lost blade from number three propeller, hit engine number four.
- June 21, 1977: USN EC-130Q TACAMO III BuNo 156176, c/n 4280, of VQ-3, crashed in the Pacific Ocean after night take-off from Wake Island.
- April 15, 1978: C-130E 63-7787, c/n 3854, of the 314th Tactical Airlift Wing, got into fin stall, crashed near Barstow, California.
- April 28, 1978: C-130E 63-7766, c/n 3832, of the 17th Tactical Airlift Squadron, crashed short of runway at Sparrevohn Air Force Station, Alaska, written off.
- September 8, 1978: C-130E 64-0532, c/n 4021, of the 314th Tactical Airlift Wing, hit mountain in Arkansas in bad weather – 62nd Tactical Airlift Squadron crew. All 12 crew members died. Instructor Pilot Capt Ed Hayashi. Flying in formation prior to crash.
- November 30, 1978: C-130E 68-10936, c/n 4316, of the 317th Tactical Airlift Wing, 41st Tactical Airlift Squadron, struck by lightning, crashed 55 kilometers west of Charleston, South Carolina.
- December 10, 1978: C-130E 68-10951, c/n 4331, of the 314th Tactical Airlift Wing, crashed on approach to Fort Campbell Army Air Field, Kentucky – engine control wire failure.

==== 1980s ====
- March 14, 1980: C-130H 74-2064, c/n 4659, of the 463d Tactical Airlift Wing, crashed during approach to Incirlik Air Base in southeastern Turkey. While descending to an altitude of 5,000 feet, the crew was cleared to continue to 3,000 feet when an explosion occurred in the left wing. The airplane crashed 25 km west of the base.
- April 24, 1980: During the ill-fated secret rescue mission at an airstrip in the Great Salt Desert of Eastern Iran, near Tabas codenamed Operation Eagle Claw, an EC-130E, 62-1809, c/n 3770, of the 7th ACCS, was destroyed in collision with a USN RH-53D Sea Stallion helicopter, BuNo 158761. As the helicopter took off it flew into the wing root of the EC-130 and crashed, killing five USAF aircrew in the C-130 and three USMC aircrew in the RH-53 All of the RH-53Ds had to be abandoned at the site. At least one airframe was assembled from the abandoned helicopters, to join six RH-53Ds supplied by the United States to the Iranian Navy in 1978.
- October 2, 1980: C-130A 56-0504, c/n 3112, of the 105th Tactical Airlift Squadron, lost part of port wing leading edge, crashed near McMinnville, Tennessee. Aircraft had been operated by Air America as 604, c. February 1970.
- October 29, 1980: An extensively modified YMC-130H, 74-1683, c/n 4658, crashed at Eglin AFB Auxiliary Field 1, Wagner Field, Florida, during a demonstration of a modified MC-130H Combat Talon aircraft for a planned Iranian hostage rescue attempt named Operation Credible Sport. Arresting rockets fitted to the aircraft fired out of sequence, some early and some not at all, resulting in an extremely heavy landing that tore off the starboard wing and set the aircraft on fire. Despite this mishap, the entire crew survived. The wrecked hull was dismantled and those parts not salvageable buried at Wagner Field. Rumors persist that the hull was rebuilt as an AC-130H gunship, however due to the highly classified nature of the gunship, there is no known documented evidence to support this.
- January 14, 1981: C-130E 69-6581, c/n 4357, of the 37th Tactical Airlift Squadron, crashed on take-off from Ramstein Air Base, West Germany – fin stall, missing washer on rudder booster.
- February 26, 1981: MC-130E-Y 64-0564, c/n 4074, of the 1st Special Operations Squadron, crashed in sea near Tabones Island, Philippines during low-level turn.
- September 21, 1981: C-130H 74-1672, c/n 4623, of the 463d Tactical Airlift Wing, crashed 1,600 meters short of runway during night landing on desert airstrip near Indian Springs Air Force Auxiliary Field, Nevada.
- April 13, 1982: C-130H 74-1678, c/n 4645, of the 463d Tactical Airlift Wing, as of October 1977 with black camel on tail. Crashed near Sivas, 360 kilometers east of Ankara, Turkey, when number four (starboard outer) engine mount failed, destroyed number three (starboard inner) engine, wing broke.
- May 13, 1982: C-130E 64-0543, c/n 4033, of the 314th Tactical Airlift Wing, crashed when wing broke during formation flight near Judsonia, Arkansas.
- July 30, 1982: USCG HC-130H CG1600, c/n 4757, assigned Kodiak CGAS, crashed 4 kilometers south of Attu, Aleutian Islands, in bad weather landing, killing two Coast Guardsmen aboard.
- February 13, 1983: C-130H 74-1693, c/n 4693, of the 463d Tactical Airlift Wing, suffered a ground fire at Pope Air Force Base, North Carolina, written off. To loadmaster trainer at Pope, as of April 1984; fuselage only, same August 2012.
- June 28, 1983: C-130H 74-2068, c/n 4694, of the 463d Tactical Airlift Wing, crashed about 100 miles north of Nellis Air Force Base, Nevada, during Red Flag exercise. Stalled turning at low altitude.
- February 28, 1984: C-130E 68-10944, c/n 4324, of the 37th Tactical Airlift Squadron, crashed into mountains 55 kilometres (34 mi) northwest of Zaragoza, Spain, near the town of Borja.
- November 2, 1984: C-130E 68-10946, c/n 4326, of the 37th Tactical Airlift Squadron, crash landing at Giebelstadt Army Airfield, West Germany, nose section removed and used to repair c/n 4029, C-130E 64-0539, of the 317th Tactical Airlift Wing, damaged when it ran off runway at Lajes, Azores, April 1984.
- December 29, 1984: L-100 c/n 4101, first flown September 17, 1965, leased to Continental Air Services, N9260R, September 1965, then sold to the Government of Zambia, registered 9J-RCV, August 1966. Leased to Zambian Air Cargoes, August 1966, then sold to National Aircraft Leasing, registered N920NA, March 1969, in an FAA series usually reserved for aircraft of the National Aeronautics and Space Administration, same January 1977. Leased to Alaska Airlines, April 1969. Leased to Saturn Airways, N24ST, June 1972, modified to L-100-30, November 1972. Leased to TIA, December 1976, port wing and engines damaged in explosion, May 1977, repaired; sold to TIA, April 1979. To Transamerica, October 1979, green and white scheme, Transamerica T on green tail in white – destroyed on ground as it landed Cafunfo, Angola during UNITA guerrilla attack. Electric buss panel fire due to gunfire spread, hull burnt out. Pilot, flight engineer survive groundfire and are captured by UNITA, repatriated through the Red Cross after a month; first officer, two Diamang couriers, killed by gunfire.
- January 22, 1985: A USAF C-130A 56-0501, c/n 3109, of the 95th Tactical Airlift Squadron, crashed in the sea during visual approach to Trujillo airport, Honduras.
- March 12, 1985: C-130E 64-0549, c/n 4044, of the 314th Tactical Airlift Wing, crashed when it stalled during supply drop training mission at Fort Hood, Texas.
- September 9, 1986: C-130A, 56-0468, c/n 3076, delivered February 1957; of the 105th Tactical Airlift Squadron, Nashville, Tennessee, by December 1979, same January 1984. Lizard scheme, January 1986, crashed at end of runway, Fort Campbell, Kentucky – broken throttle cable.
- July 1, 1987: A USAF C-130E, 68-10945, c/n 4325, crashed during an open house at Fort Bragg, during a display of the low level airdrop technique known as LAPES (Low Altitude Parachute Extraction System), in which a parachute is used to pull the cargo out the rear door while the plane flies just above the ground. The aircraft struck the ground and the pilot was unable to pull-up after the M551 Sheridan tank damaged the aircraft on deployment. The aircraft hit the treeline, burned, killing four on board, one soldier on the ground, and injuring two crew.
- June 8, 1988: C-130E 61-2373, c/n 3720, of the 154th Tactical Airlift Training Squadron, crashed five kilometers short of runway while on approach to Greenville, Mississippi.
- August 9, 1989: C-130H 74-1681, c/n 4654, of the 463d Tactical Airlift Wing, crashed while dropping M551 Sheridan tank at Fort Bragg, North Carolina – load hung-up, parachute deployed.
- November 27, 1989: L-100 c/n 4129, delivered to ZAC-Alexander, registered 9J-RBW, April 1966, sold to Maple Leaf Leasing, 1969, leased to Pacific Western Airlines, line number 383, March 1969, damaged Eureka, Northwest Territory, August 1969, rebuilt as L-100-20, December 1969. Leased to Alaska International Air (earlier Interior Airways, later Markair), December 1969. Sold to Pacific Western Airlines, registered CF-PWN, 1977, then sold to St. Lucia Airways, registered J6-SLO, May 1985, named "Juicy Lucy", after a rock and roll band, 1969–1972, transporting cargo for UNITA, July 1987. Sold to Tepper Aviation, Florida, N9205T, January 1988, named "Grey Ghost" – crash landing at Jamba, Huíla, Angola.

==== 1990s ====
- August 12, 1990: L-100-20, c/n 4384, delivered July 1970 to Saturn Airways, N11ST, named "W.C. Fields", modified to L-100-30, April 1971, leased to Alaska International Air (earlier Interior Airways, later Markair). Registered to TIA, December 1976. With Transamerica as of October 1979, airframe reached 44,000 hour mark, December 1984. Leased to Southern Air Transport, July 1986, registered to SAT, October 1987, reregistered N911SJ, March 1988, same March 1990. Engine failed on take-off from Juba, Sudan, returned for landing, overran runway, burned – written off.
- January 31, 1991: C-130E 69-6567, c/n 4341, modified to AC-130E, ops by 415th Special Operations Training Squadron, Hurlburt Field, Florida, by September 1972. Modified to AC-130H, 1973, to 16th Special Operations Squadron, by July 1978, electronic update, September 1990. Callsign 'Spirit 03', after opting to stay in the air knowing they would be vulnerable to enemy fire, stayed to cover a platoon of U.S. Marines on the ground; shot down by an SA-7 at dawn 110 kilometers south-southeast of Kuwait City, Kuwait in the Battle of Khafji. The crew of 14 was lost. This was largest single loss of life by the U.S. Air Force during Operation Desert Storm, and the last loss of an AC-130 due to enemy fire to date.
- September 2, 1991: L-100 c/n 4250, delivered December 1968 to National Aircraft Leasing, registered N9266R, leased the Interior Department, December 1968. Modified to L-100-20. Leased to Saturn Airways, registered N22ST, January 1971, then leased to Southern Air Transport, September 1972. Leased to Alaska International Air (formerly Interior Airways, later Markair), October 1975. Leased again to Southern Air Transport, April 1977, then sold to SAT, June 1978. Leased to Air Algérie, 1981. Registered to Commercial Air Leasing, N521SJ, June 1985, same November 1987. Leased to IAS/Diamang, 1986 – January 1987. Operations in Ethiopia for Caritas, November 1988. Blown-up by mine before take-off from Wau, Sudan.
- February 6, 1992: A C-130B, 58-0732, c/n 3527, of the 165th Tactical Airlift Squadron, Kentucky Air National Guard, with five crew aboard (3 pilots, one flight engineer and one loadmaster), stalled after a touch-and-go with a simulated engine failure and crashed into a hotel one mile south of Evansville Regional Airport, Evansville, Indiana, United States, on U.S. Highway 41. Seventeen people were killed in the crash and fifteen others were injured.
- April 24, 1992: C-130H flown by the 310th Airlift Squadron based at Howard Air Force Base, Panama was intercepted, shot at, and struck by two Peruvian Air Force Sukhoi Su-22 fighter jets approximately 60 miles off the coast of Peru in international airspace. The heavily damaged aircraft made an emergency landing at Peruvian Air Force Base at Talara. Six of 14 crew members were injured, and one was killed.
- April 28, 1992: C-130E, 64-0501, c/n 3985, of the 317th Tactical Airlift Wing, fitted with All Weather Airborne Delivery System, AWADS, lizard paint scheme as of August 1991, crashed into Blewett Falls Lake, North Carolina.
- August 27, 1992: USN C-130F BuNo 149794, c/n 3661, delivered March 1963. Assigned to VRC-50, Andersen Air Force Base, Guam, as of July 1992. Damaged by Typhoon Omar, Guam – broken up, August 1994.
- October 7, 1992: C-130E 63-7881, callsign 'Decoy 81', c/n 3952, of the 167th Tactical Airlift Squadron, crashed after wing hit power line near, Berkeley Springs, West Virginia. Six crew members killed with damage to property on ground.
- February 3, 1993: A Lockheed L-100-20 N130X, c/n 4412, used as the Lockheed HTTB (High Technology Test Bed), crashed at Dobbins Air Reserve Base, in Marietta, Georgia. The Lockheed engineering testbed was used to evaluate the fly-by-wire rudder actuator and the ground minimum control speed (VMCG). During the final high-speed ground test-run, the aircraft accidentally veered left and became airborne. The Hercules climbed to 250 feet and crashed. All seven crew aboard perished in the crash, in which a Navy clinic was narrowly missed.
- March 14, 1994: AC-130H 69-0576, c/n 4351, callsign 'Jockey 14', of the 16th Special Operations Squadron, crashed in sea, seven kilometers south of Malindi, Kenya, after take-off from Mombasa – Howitzer round exploded in gun barrel causing fire in port engines, eight of fourteen crew killed.
- March 23, 1994: An F-16D Fighting Falcon, AF Ser. No. 88-0171, collided in the landing approach pattern with a C-130E Hercules, AF Ser. No. 68-10942, c/n 4322. The F-16D skidded into a C-141B Starlifter, AF Ser No. 66-0173, at the Green Ramp, Pope Air Force Base, North Carolina, where paratroopers from adjacent Fort Bragg were preparing for a drop mission. The ensuing explosion sent debris raining down on soldiers and airmen waiting to board the C-141. The C-130 managed to land safely. The incident is described in the book Disaster at Green Ramp by Mary Ellen Condon-Rall. The incident is also categorized as the deadliest peacetime accident ever.
- August 13, 1994: A civilian Lockheed C-130A, N135FF, former USAF 56-0540, c/n 3148, operating as Tanker 82, crashed in steep mountainous terrain near Pearblossom, California. The aircraft was destroyed, killing the three people on board. The aircraft was owned by Aero Firefighting Service Company, Inc., and was operated by Hemet Valley Flying Service, Inc., on lease to the U.S. Forest Service as a public use aircraft.
- May 13, 1995: C-130E, 62-1838, c/n 3801, 'Sumit 38', operated by the 302d Airlift Wing, Peterson AFB, Colorado. Number 2 engine caught fire at a cruise altitude of 26K ft AGL after departing Boise, Idaho. The aircraft commander directed the flight engineer to discharge an extinguisher bottle, when that failed to put out the fire, the second one was activated. However, the fire re-ignited and the aircraft had no further extinguishing capability. Crew attempted to divert to Mountain Home AFB, Idaho (MUO). Number 2 engine improperly disengaged from its mount, causing severe fuselage and wing damage. Wing eventually severed completely from the airframe, causing Sumit 38 to crash approximately 23 minutes after leaving Boise, killing all six crewmembers. This was the only Hercules hull loss in the entire calendar year of 1995, making it the safest year of C-130/L-100 operation since 1963.
- August 17, 1996: C-130H 74-1662, c/n 4597, of the 40th Airlift Squadron, Dyess Air Force Base, Texas crashed into Sheep Mountain after departure from Jackson Hole Airport in supporting presidential mission. Remnants of the crash debris still remain on the mountain today.
- November 22, 1996: HC-130H 64-14856, c/n 4072, delivered June 1965 to Air Force Systems Command, Edwards Air Force Base, California, June 1965, same, May 1966, modified to JHC-130H, June 1966. To 48th Aerospace Rescue and Recovery Squadron, August 1966, to 55th Aerospace Rescue and Recovery Squadron, December 1966. Revert to HC-130H and assigned to the 305th Aerospace Rescue and Recovery Squadron, May 1975, same, June 1976, to 303rd ARRS by October 1977, same March 1984, in lizard camouflage by October 1984. To 304th ARRS, January 1986, same, redesignated HC-130P, May 1990, in lizard camouflage, August 1994, same, December 1995. Under call sign King 56, crashed into the Pacific Ocean, 113 kilometers west of Eureka, California, fuel starvation – all engines stopped. Ten of eleven crew killed.
- April 1, 1997: C-130H 88-4408, c/n 5161, of the 95th Tactical Airlift Squadron, crashed after overshooting a landing at Toncontín International Airport, Honduras. Three of the ten occupants were killed.
- December 10, 1999: C-130E 63-7854, c/n 3924, of the 61st Airlift Squadron, forward deployed to Kuwait from Little Rock AFB, Arkansas, touched down 880 meters short of runway at Ahmad al-Jaber Air Base, Kuwait causing major airframe distortion of the fuselage and severely damaging main landing gear; three USAF fatalities in cargo bay. Belly-landed at Kuwait International Airport. Partially dismantled in Kuwait, then transported to AMARC, Davis-Monthan Air Force Base, Arizona, CF0194, December 2000, to be scrapped, May 2004, same, February 2006.

==== 2000s ====
- September 6, 2000: C-130A N116TG of T&G Aviation, Marana, Arizona, crashed at Burzet, southeastern France fighting forest fire. The Hercules, operating for the French Sécurité Civile, crashed while it was dumping water over a forest fire. The aircraft had just carried out a first passage; on the second one it flew into a hill. Two of four crew killed.
- January 9, 2002: KC-130R 160021 of the USMC (VMGR-352) crashed into mountainous terrain while on approach to Shamsi, Pakistan, 270 kilometers SW of Quetta, Pakistan, killing all seven crew members on board.
- February 12, 2002: KC-130F 148895 of the USMC (VMGR-252) crash-landed in the desert at Twentynine Palms, California, when two engines flamed out due to fuel starvation during a touch-and-go landing. All crew members survived.
- February 13, 2002: MC-130P 66-0213 of the USAF Air Force Special Operations Command (AFSOC) (9th Special Operations Squadron), crashed in Afghanistan on night refueling mission.
- June 12, 2002: MC-130H Combat Talon II 84-0875 of the USAF (15th Special Operations Squadron) crashed at Sardeh Band Airport near Band E Sardeh Dam in Afghanistan.
- June 17, 2002: C-130A N130HP of Hawkins & Powers Aviation crashed while fighting a fire in northern California, the starboard wing of the aircraft came off as the centre wing box failed during a pull-out from a drop near Walker, California, followed less than a second later by the port wing. It rolled inverted and crashed into the forest, killing all three crew. This second C-130A fire fighting crash, coupled with the loss of a PB4Y-2 at Estes Park, Colorado on July 18, 2002, resulted in the U.S. Department of the Interior canceling its contract for all heavy tankers. (See 2002 airtanker crashes)
- August 7, 2002: MC-130H Combat Talon II 90-0161 of the USAF (15th Special Operations Squadron) crashed after takeoff from Naval Station Roosevelt Roads, Puerto Rico.
- September 28, 2004: C-130H 84-0211 of the USAF (142nd Airlift Squadron, Delaware Air National Guard) was damaged by tornado at New Castle County Airport, Delaware, not repaired – scrapped March 2005.
- December 29, 2004: MC-130H Combat Talon II 85-0012 of the USAF (15th Special Operations Squadron), landed on a runway in Iraq in darkness that was undergoing maintenance. The aircraft was destroyed but no deaths.
- March 31, 2005: MC-130H Combat Talon II 87-0127 of the USAF (7th Special Operations Squadron, 352d Special Operations Group, RAF Mildenhall, United Kingdom), departed Tirana-Rinas Airport, Albania, for a night training mission to work on terrain-following and avoidance skills, airdrops and landing using night-vision goggles. The aircraft was flying 300 feet above the mountainous terrain when it was approaching a ridge. The airplane was not able to clear the ridge and stalled as the crew attempted to climb away. The aircraft struck the ridge, destroying the aircraft and killing all nine crew members on board.
- June 28, 2006: HC-130H 1710 of the United States Coast Guard crashed at Saint Paul Island, Alaska. There were no reported injuries among the nine crewmen on board.
- July 18, 2007: L-100-30 N401LC of Lynden Cargo, Alaska, over-rotated on take-off from gravel airstrip 24 miles (38 km) west-northwest of McGrath, Alaska, suffering tail strike and substantial damage, including puncture of main cabin pressure vessel. Four crew uninjured.
- June 27, 2008: C-130H 86-0412 of the USAF (a forward deployed aircraft assigned to the Air Force Reserve Command's 95th Airlift Squadron, 440th Airlift Wing at Pope AFB, North Carolina) performed an emergency crash landing at a barren field northeast of Baghdad, Iraq following the loss of all four engines. There were no fatalities. After all usable parts were stripped from the aircraft, it was dismantled by a series of controlled explosions by the 447th Expeditionary Civil Engineer Squadron. The wreckage was then transported to a secure US installation.
- October 29, 2009: HC-130H-7 1705 of the USCG, from Coast Guard Air Station Sacramento, California, with seven crewmembers collided with a United States Marine Corps Bell AH-1W SuperCobra of HMLA-469, 15 miles (24 km) E of San Clemente Island, near San Diego. Both aircraft were destroyed. There were no survivors.

==== 2010s ====
- July 1, 2012: MAFFS-equipped Air Force C-130H, assigned to the 145th Airlift Wing, North Carolina Air National Guard, Morris Field, Charlotte, crashed in southwest South Dakota while fighting the White Draw Fire, killing four crew and seriously injuring two.
- May 19, 2013: C-130J Super Hercules, 04-3144 from the 41st Airlift Squadron, 19th Airlift Wing, Little Rock Air Force Base, Arkansas, crashed during landing at Forward Operating Base Shank, Afghanistan when it ran off the runway and struck a ditch, which collapsed the nose gear and ripped the right main landing gear from the fuselage. The #4 engine struck the ground, pressurized fuel and oil lines were broken, fluid was sprayed over the cracked engine casing, and the right wing caught fire. There were no injuries or fatalities as a result of this accident.
- April 21, 2015: An AC-130J went beyond limits of sideways flight during testing, and temporarily lost flight control. The aircraft landed safely, but the hull was damaged beyond repair and written off.
- October 2, 2015: A C-130J crashed during takeoff from Jalalabad Airport in eastern Afghanistan, killing all six US service members and five contractors on board as well as three people on the ground. The co-pilot had hard-blocked the yoke to force the elevators into an up position during unloading. He failed to remove the hard-block before takeoff. The plane was assigned to the 317th Airlift Group whereas the crew came from the 455th Air Expeditionary Wing group.
- July 10, 2017: KC-130T 165000 of the United States Marine Corps crashed on a flight in Leflore County, Mississippi, killing 16 people on board. The aircraft was from VMGR-452 and broke apart in flight due to the departure of the #2 propeller blade into the fuselage. This was a result of Warner Robins depot level "failure to remove existing and detectable corrosion pitting and intregranular cracks." In July 2024, an Air Force engineer was arrested and charged with two counts of making false statements and two counts of obstruction of justice. The US Justice Department alleged that the engineer had "engaged in a pattern of conduct intended to avoid scrutiny for his past engineering decisions related to why the crash may have occurred", including concealing documents; however, on March 5, 2026, that engineer was acquitted of all charges.
- May 2, 2018: An Air National Guard WC-130H, 65-0968, from the 156th Airlift Wing out of Puerto Rico crashed after departing from the Savannah/Hilton Head International Airport, killing all nine on board.
- December 6, 2018: A Marine Corps F/A-18D Hornet from VMFA(AW)-242 crashed into a KC-130J from VMGR-152 off the east coast of Japan around 2:00 am killing six out of seven Marines.
- August 25, 2019: C-130A N119TG owned by Mesa, Arizona-based company International Air Response, was badly damaged in a runway excursion during an emergency landing at Santa Barbara Municipal Airport after having engine and hydraulic problems shortly after takeoff from Santa Maria Public Airport; the seven people on board were unhurt. The accident was attributed to corrosion-related breakage of the #3 bleed air duct, which blew hot air towards nearby wiring and hydraulic lines, causing system failures.

==== 2020s ====
- September 29, 2020: A Marine Corps F-35B from VMFA-121 crashed into a KC-130J (166765) from VMGR-352 while performing in air refueling. The KC-130J caught fire, lost two engines on the same wing and crash landed in a field near Thermal, California. All eight Marines on board survived.
- April 5, 2026: Two C-130s which were stationed at a makeshift U.S. remote base in Iran were blown up by the US when three replacements planes arrived, to prevent them falling into Iranian hands. This occurred during a rescue mission for the WSO of a McDonnell Douglas F-15E Strike Eagle which was shot down on April 3 during the 2026 Iran war.

=== Venezuela ===
- September 3, 1976: C-130H FAV-7772 c/n 4408, of the Venezuelan Air Force crashed after three attempts of landing in bad weather, in high winds and low visibility on the fringe of Hurricane Emmy, at Lajes Air Base, Terceira Island, Azores, Portugal. The aircraft was carrying 58 passengers (members of the "Orfeón Universitario" of UCV-Venezuelan Central University, in flight to Barcelona, Spain to participate in the "Festival Internacional del Canto Coral") and 10 crew members. In all, 68 people died.
- November 4, 1980: C-130H FAV-3556 of the Venezuelan Air Force crashed after engine failure near Caracas. Eleven people died.

=== Yemen ===
- November 18, 2010: C-130H 1160 of the Yemeni Air Force (115 Squadron), suffered a landing accident at Sana'a, Yemen.

=== Zaire ===
- August 18, 1974: C-130H 9T-TCD of the Zaire Air Force crashed at Kisangani, Zaire.
- September 14, 1980: C-130H, 9T-TCE of the Zaire Air Force crashed during climb-out from Kindu, Zaire after suffering an engine failure.
- April 19, 1990: C-130H, 9T-TCG of the Zaire Air Force crashed near Kinshasa, Zaire, propeller blade broke off.

=== Zambia ===
- April 11, 1968: L-100 (MSN 382-4109) 9J-RBZ of Zambian Air Cargo was destroyed in ground collision with L-100 (MSN 382-4137) 9J-RBX at Ndola, when returning from Dar es Salaam – brake failure.
- April 11, 1968: L-100 (MSN 382-4137) 9J-RBX of Zambian Air Cargo was destroyed in ground collision when hit by L-100 (MSN 382-4109) 9J-RBZ at Ndola, Angola.
- June 10, 1991: DC-130A 56-0491 (MSN 182-3099) J6-SLQ operating for the Angolan government crashed on take-off from Luanda, load shifted, burned.

== See also ==
- Lists of accidents and incidents involving military aircraft
