= Lars Olausson =

Swedish Air Force officer

- Born: 20 May 1927; Älvdalen, Sweden
- Died: 18 June 2016 (aged 89); Grästorp, Sweden
- Military career
- Allegiance: Sweden
- Branch: Swedish Air Force
- Service years: 1947–1987
- Rank: Lieutenant Colonel
- Nickname: Mr Hercules

Lars Oskar Olausson (20 May 1927 – 18 June 2016) was a Lieutenant Colonel of the Swedish Air Force, who published an annual volume on the history of the Lockheed C-130 Hercules airlifter currently titled the Lockheed Hercules Production List 1954-2014, the thirtieth edition having been printed March 2012. "For each aircraft listed, the Lockheed model number, military designation, owner and serial number are quoted, with additional information in a remarks column, giving such details as delivery dates, earlier or later markings, using squadron and write-off date."

== Career ==
Olausson was born in Älvdalen, Sweden, the son of Oscar Olausson and his wife Ebba (née Käns). He passed studentexamen in Västervik in 1947 and then began his 27-year career in the Swedish Air Force as an officer cadet, flying the Bücker Bestmann, Harvard, Vampire, and P-51 Mustang, in that order. He was a flight engineer at the Swedish Air Force Flying School in 1953 and decided the same year that he was not suited to be an officer, and got himself into the Royal Institute of Technology in Stockholm. In 1954 he was a flight engineer at Uppland Wing (F 16) (Flygvapnets Uppsalaskolor). After 4½ years, he reentered the Swedish Air Force as an engineer officer, flying the Saab J 29A fighter, A 32A Lansen attack, and AJ 37 Viggen (also attack but primarily doing check flying after maintenance).

Olausson was flight director 2nd degree and technical director at Skaraborg Wing (F 7) from 1960 and flight director 1st degree from 1963. His main job was as base technical officer, with general responsibility for all technical activities on the base (but not building and field maintenance), a diversified position. He was locally responsible for the introduction of the C-130 Hercules, starting with a technical four week course at Marietta in 1965. He logged only a few hours on the Hercules, but added about 30 minutes pilot time on the C-5 Galaxy.

As a retired pilot and officer of Swedish C-130 F 7 Wing squadron service, his worldwide contacts allowed Olausson to construct a detailed history of every Hercules built, with upwards of 2,350 hulls accounted for. As the Hercules has seen worldwide service in the last fifty years, it pinpoints global hotspots by its use, and Olausson's efforts provide a source for operators' discrete records, from Air America and the CIA in Southeast Asia, up to the covert rendition aircraft of current day. It would appear that Lockheed Martin, the current producer of the C-130, finds the volume a useful reference, as they provide substantial new production information each year. The current edition runs 170 pages, the upper limit of international postal weight rates the author is willing to bear. Olausson's efforts have contributed a valuable resource to the Hercules community.

== Personal life ==
In 1956, Olausson married Gudrun Christensen (born 1932), the daughter of the merchant S. Christensen and Margareta Svensson. He was the father of Anders (born 1958), Fredrik (born 1961), Ulla (1964) and Nina (born 1964). Olausson used to reside in Såtenäs and later in Grästorp.

Lars Olausson died aged 89 on the 18 June 2016.

== See also ==
- List of C-130 Hercules crashes
- St. Lucia Airways
- Southern Air Transport
- Tepper Aviation
