= 1989 Jamba Lockheed Hercules crash =

Aviation incident in Angola

1989 Jamba Hercules crash
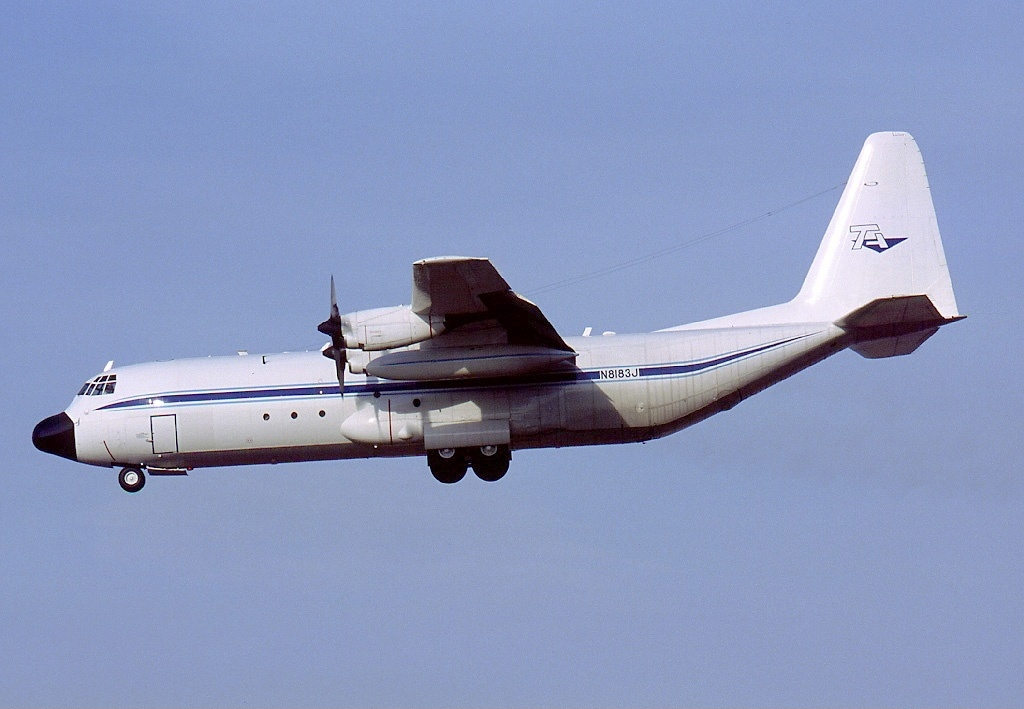
- A Tepper Aviation Lockheed L-100-30 Hercules, similar to the one that crashed

Accident
- Date: 27 November 1989
- Summary: Undetermined; possible CFIT
- Site: Jamba, Cuando Cubango, Angola; 14°52′23″S 15°53′17″E

Aircraft
- Aircraft type: Lockheed Hercules L-100-20
- Operator: Tepper Aviation for CIA
- Registration: N9205T
- Flight origin: Kamina Air Base, Democratic Republic of the Congo
- Destination: Jamba, Cuando Cubango, Angola
- Occupants: 18 or more (see sources)
- Passengers: 11
- Crew: 6
- Fatalities: 12 or more
- Injuries: 0 publicly known
- Survivors: 6 or more

The 1989 Jamba Hercules crash was an air accident involving a CIA Lockheed Hercules L-100 aircraft that crashed on final approach to Jamba, Cuando Cubango, Angola, on 27 November 1989 while secretly delivering weapons and guerrillas to a US-funded insurgency as part of a long-term secret operation to arm UNITA.

The flight originated at Kamina Air Base, Zaire, the hub for the secret CIA supply-line to UNITA, and was attempting a low-level approach at night. The aircraft was owned by CIA front company Tepper Aviation.

== Cause ==
The crash was attributed to pilot error by US officials and by a UNITA spokesperson. The CIA later reportedly "seemed to amend its findings, in part to mollify [the pilot's] surviving family. There was talk of a faulty altimeter or other instrument."

The Bureau of Aircraft Accident Archives reported:

While approaching Jamba, the crew descended too low to avoid MPLA radar detection when on final, the aircraft struck trees and crashed in flames. All five crew members were killed. At the time of the accident, the visibility was poor due to the night and the runway was unlighted.

Don Rogers, who had worked at Tepper Aviation (and related CIA front company St. Lucia Airways), and had flown similar missions to Jamba, and knew several of the people involved wrote:

That Tepper crash was an accident looking for a place to happen. The entire crew was very inexperienced. I know it's not nice to speak ill of the dead, but [the captain during the crash] was a real idiot. [I had previously worked with him when he was a first officer and he had set the brakes incorrectly on a different mission which caused a plane to roll partly off the runway and require a recovery operation.] He was a Brit who lived in St. Lucia and ran a charter boat business. He may have been a good boat pilot, but he sucked as an airplane pilot.

The FO [during the crashed flight] was Bud Petty, the president of Tepper Aviation. He was a very likeable guy, but had almost no experience in the Herc. He was a retired US Army warrant officer flying helicopters in Vietnam. The [flight engineer] was a German, Gerhard Reiger, also an extremely likeable guy [but] only had about 300 hours as an FE. There was also a new hire captain observer on his first flight to Jamba, ... Kim Heller. He had much more time in the left seat of a Herc than the combined time of the rest of the crew.

== Political consequences ==
Because the crashed plane was carrying weapons to guerrillas, it created diplomatic problems for US negotiations about the Angolan Civil War and other conflicts, and was thought to undermine the United States' criticism of Soviet weapons supplies to regional conflicts around the world. Two days earlier the Bush administration had criticized a similar plane crash of Soviet weapons shipped to rebels in El Salvador. The CIA crash in Jamba was an attempted resumption of weapon air-lifts after such flights had been suspended for several weeks as part of cease-fire efforts to stop the 14-year civil war.

Although the Bush administration officially supported UNITA financially, there was public US opposition to supporting UNITA, and the military aid and arms shipments were secret and bereaved family members had difficulty receiving information about the situation.

Manuel Pedro Pacavira, the Angolan representative at the United Nations, said in interview that the crash showed "the C.I.A. continues to instigate and encourage the war. U.S. officials talk about peace and the need for reconciliation in Angola, but they send military advisers and arms, which increase the suffering of our people."

== Occupants aboard, fatalities, and survivors ==
On board were 4-6 Americans, 11 UNITA members, two West Germans, and a Briton. US officials said that all the Americans on board were killed in the accident, but that several people survived. Reportedly a UNITA member age 16 or younger survived almost completely unharmed.

Years passed before researchers learned who exactly had died among the Western occupants because the CIA and government wanted to distance itself from supplying the UNITA insurgents. Some family members of the deceased later learned that the coffins brought by the CIA were empty and they had not been allowed to confirm remains; associated records listed an "Unknown" circumstance, place, and date of death.

The known deaths in the crash were:

- Pharies "Bud" Petty (in some cases erroneously reported as "Peddy") the nominal head of Tepper Aviation, who was piloting as first officer and co-pilot. Petty several months earlier had categorically denied flying weapons to Angola but Tepper Aviation had been delivering CIA weapons and supplies to UNITA since 1988.
- Michael Atkinson - Captain. British.
- Western media did not include details of the Angolan occupants of the plane other than the fact that approximately a dozen UNITA members were aboard.
- Gerhard Rieger - Flight Engineer. German. Had been hired by Tepper's previous incarnation as St. Lucia Airways as a mechanic
- George Bensch - Loadmaster. German.
- George V. Lacy - Aviation Mechanic.
- Kim Heller - new hire captain observer. A person who knew several people in the crash and who had worked for Tepper said about Heller, "He had much more time in the left seat of a Herc than the combined time of the rest of the crew."
- Jimmy Spessard - Thought to be present for expertise with electronic warfare support equipment being given to UNITA.
