= Transafrik International =

Cargo airline based in Angola

IATA	ICAO	Call sign
PQ	TFK	—
- Founded: 1984
- Fleet size: 3
- Headquarters: Fujairah, United Arab Emirates
- Website: transafrik.com

Transafrik International is a cargo airline based in Angola with its offices in Fujairah, United Arab Emirates.

== History ==
Transafrik has been in operation as a privately owned airline since 1984. Transafrik International was created initially to support the operation of Roan Selection Trust International - a diamond mining company. The diamond mining site is located in Cuango River, which is only reachable by C130 Hercules. They set up a short landing area in the site. Landmines planted by UNITA prevented the MAC truck from reaching the area, so Christian Rudolph G. Hellinger (CRGH), then President of RST International, created Transafrik International. CRGH is a German national born in Leipzig, East Germany.

It is a cargo airline, with airplane registration in the Republic of São Tomé e Príncipe, is currently working on contracts for the United Nations and has previously been on contract for the WFP (World Food Program) during the civil war in Angola for relief support. In 2006 Transafrik International was approached by the UN, which is its main contractor in Africa, to re-register the fleet to another nation for aviation safety reasons. Initial approaches were conducted to re-register the fleet from São Tomé e Príncipe (S9) to Uganda (5X). However until 2008 all airplanes are still registered in São Tomé e Príncipe.

== Destinations ==
Transafrik operates freight charter flights within Africa for customers such as the United Nations and the International Committee of the Red Cross as well as other freight operators.

== Fleet ==
=== Current fleet ===
The Transafrik International fleet comprises the following aircraft (as of August 2017):

Transafik International Fleet
Aircraft	In service	Orders	Passengers	Notes
Boeing 727-100C	1	—	Cargo	
Boeing 727-100F	2	—	Cargo	
Total	3	—		

=== Former aircraft ===
The airline fleet previously included the following aircraft:

- 5 Lockheed L-100 Hercules
- 2 Douglas DC-8-32/33F

== Accidents and incidents ==
- At least two L-100 aircraft leased to the UN were shot down over UNITA-controlled territory during the late 1990s.
- On October 12, 2010, Transafrik International Flight 662, a Lockheed L-100 Hercules registered in Uganda, crashed while trying to land at Kabul. The accident killed all eight crew.
