= Transafrik International Flight 662 =

2010 aviation accident in Afghanistan

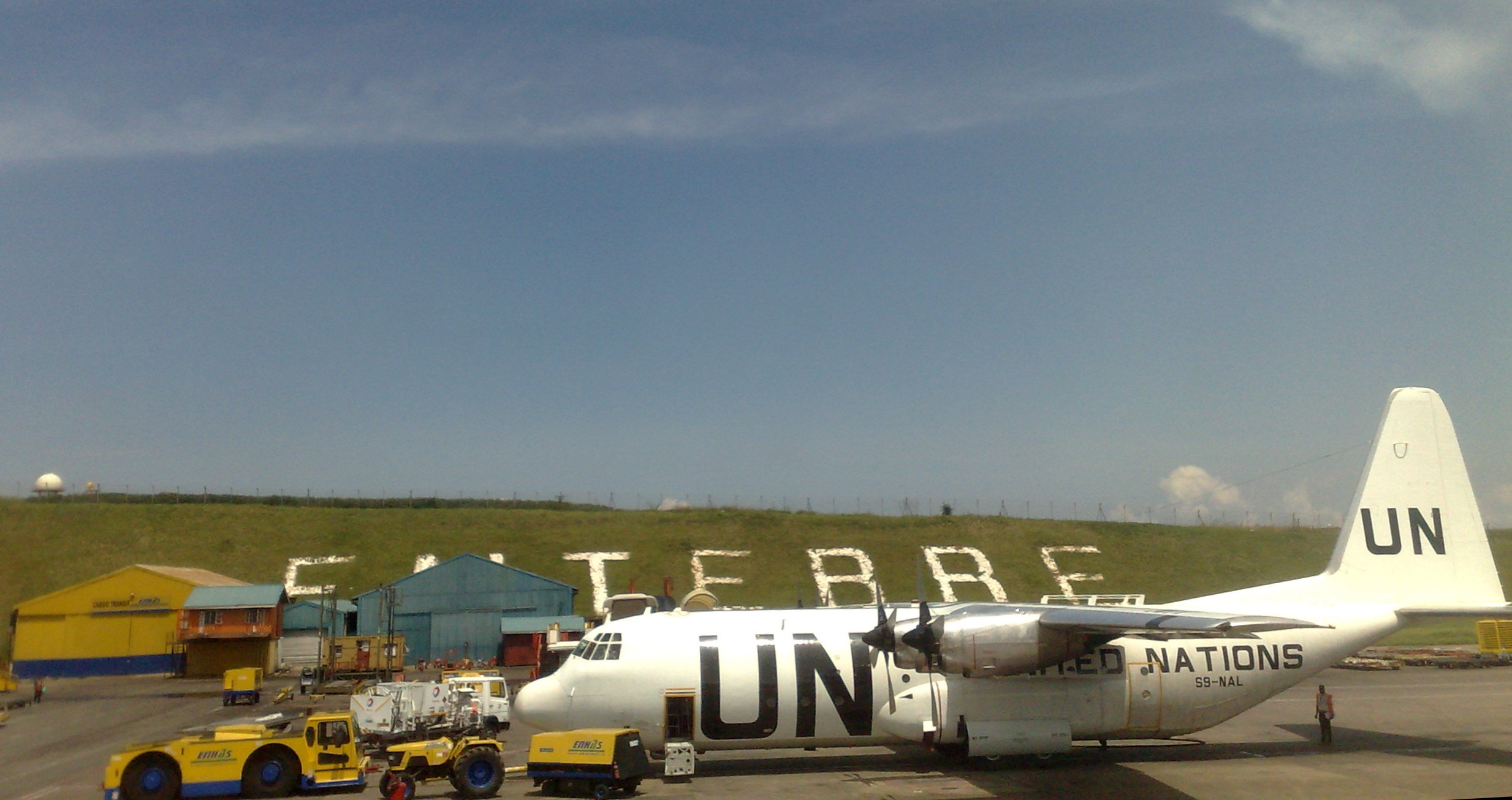
- A Lockheed L-100 Hercules similar to the one involved.

Accident
- Date: 12 October 2010; 16 years ago
- Summary: Controlled flight into terrain during approach due to pilot error and loss of situational awareness
- Site: Near Hamid Karzai International Airport

Aircraft
- Aircraft type: L-100 Hercules
- Operator: Transafrik International on behalf of National Air Cargo
- IATA flight No.: PQ662
- ICAO flight No.: TKU662
- Call sign: TRANSARIK 662
- Registration: 5X-TUC
- Flight origin: Bagram Airfield, Afghanistan
- Destination: Hamid Karzai International Airport, Afghanistan
- Occupants: 8
- Crew: 8
- Fatalities: 8
- Survivors: 0

Transafrik International Flight 662, was an L-100 cargo aircraft registered to Transafrik International of Uganda and leased to National Air Cargo "NAC" on a flight from Bagram Airfield, Afghanistan to Hamid Karzai International Airport in Kabul, Afghanistan. The aircraft crashed into a mountain peak near the Kabul Airport, causing the deaths of all eight crewmembers aboard.

== Accident ==
After sunset, at about 7:20 p.m. local time, the aircraft departed Bagram Airfield (approximately 30 miles north of Kabul) for a short flight to Kabul, performing NATO supply freight flight TKU662. TKU662, which was flying under visual flight rules (VFR), was asked by the Kabul Airport air traffic controller, Darrell Smith, to extend the outbound leg of flight in order to follow another flight inbound to the airport. The pilot, Captain Henry Bulos, complied with the request and subsequently impacted a mountain in the Pol-e Charkhi area on the outskirts of Kabul. The impact sight was approximately 11 kilometers northeast of Kabul Airport. At about 19:50 local time (15:20 GMT), the air traffic controller observed a fireball at approximately 1000 feet above the airport elevation. The impact occurred approximately 200 feet below a mountain peak.

== Aircraft ==
Aircraft	Data
Aircraft type	Fixed-wing multi-engine
Aircraft model	L-100-20 Hercules
Manufacturer	Lockheed
Serial number	382-4362
Year built	1969
First Flight	1969
Construction Number (C/N)	382-4362
Number of Seats	3
Number of Engines	4
Engine Type	Turboprop
Engine Manufacturer and Model	Allison AL501-D22A
Also Registered As	N522SJ-deregistered

== Aftermath ==
On 2 October 2012, plaintiffs filed negligence complaints against Midwest ATC, NAC and Transafrik. The claims against NAC and Transafrik were dismissed. Midwest ATC (air traffic controller Darrell Smith's employer) claimed the pilot, Captain Bulos, was responsible for the crash since he was flying the L-100 under VFR flight rules and he was solely responsible for terrain avoidance. The United States Court of Appeals for the Second Circuit stated in their decision of 9 August 2021, "...we think that a reasonable jury could also find to the contrary that Smith should have foreseen that guiding the plane, at night, toward "jet black" terrain that he was unfamiliar with (and that lay outside Class D airspace) would result in danger to Flight 662." On February 21, 2024, the U.S. District Court for the Western District of New York approved confidential settlements in the wrongful death suit against Midwest ATC.
