= 1996 Belgian Air Force Hercules accident =

Fatal aviation accident in Eindhoven, Netherlands

Coordinates: 51.4500°N 5.3744°E

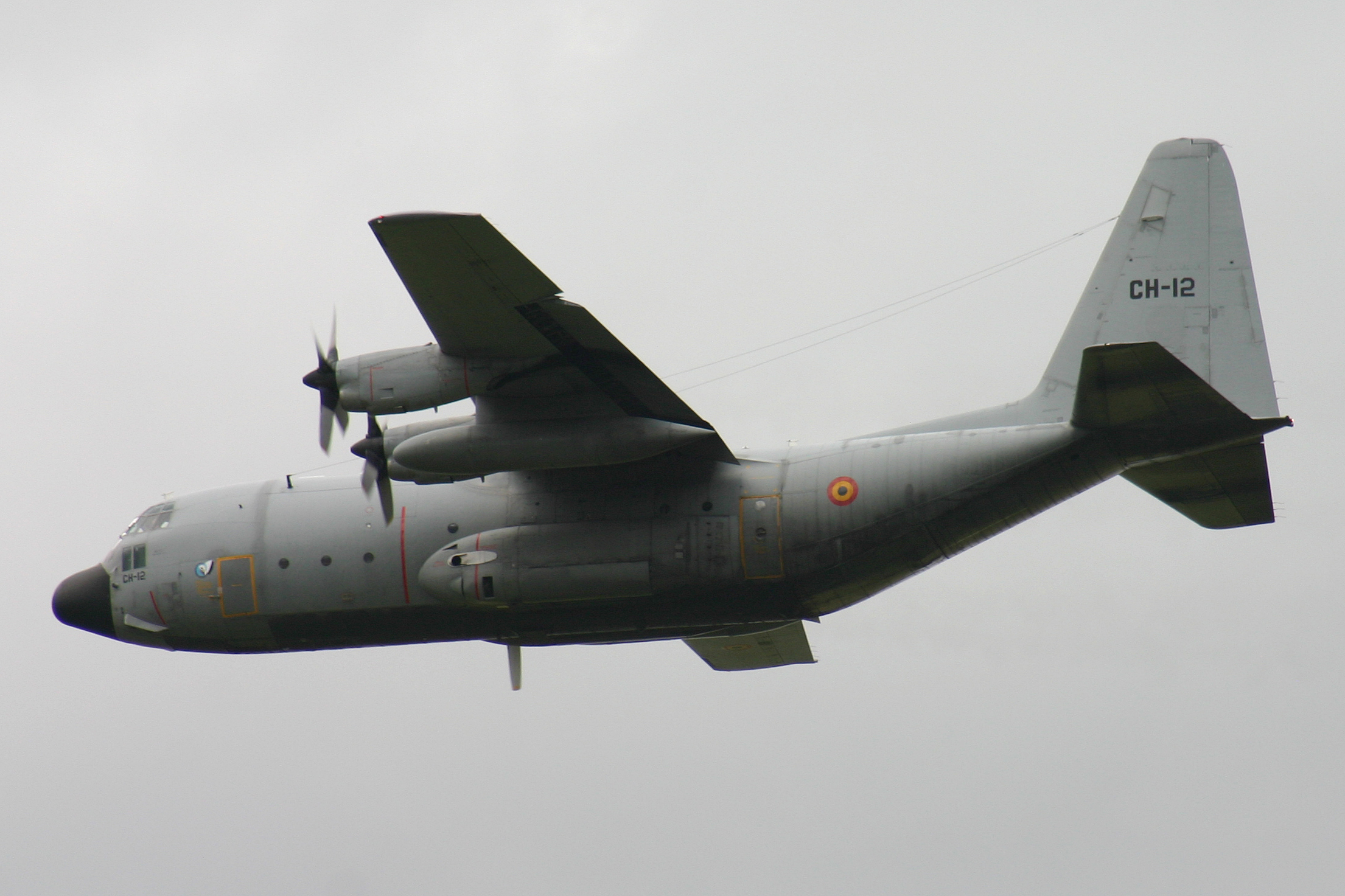
- A similar aircraft to the crashed Hercules

Accident
- Date: 15 July 1996
- Summary: Loss of power following bird strike
- Site: Eindhoven Airport, Netherlands

Aircraft
- Aircraft type: Lockheed C-130H Hercules
- Operator: Belgian Air Force
- Registration: CH-06
- Flight origin: Verona Villafranca Airport, Italy
- Last stopover: Rimini Airport, Italy
- Destination: Eindhoven Airport, Netherlands
- Passengers: 37
- Crew: 4
- Fatalities: 34
- Injuries: 7
- Survivors: 7

The 1996 Belgian Air Force Hercules accident is an aviation accident that occurred on 15 July 1996 at Eindhoven Airport, the Netherlands. The disaster involved a Belgian Lockheed C-130 Hercules aircraft and resulted in the death of 34 passengers. The incident is known as the "Hercules disaster" (Dutch: Herculesramp) in the Netherlands and Belgium.

== Accident ==
At 6:02 pm local time, the transport aircraft crashed at Eindhoven Airport with a total of 41 people on board: Four Belgian crew members and 37 young members of the Fanfarekorps of the Royal Netherlands Army. As the aircraft was coming in to land at Eindhoven, it encountered a flock of birds; it overshot the runway, but lost power and crashed into the ground; a fire broke out, which destroyed the cockpit and forward fuselage, killing 34 people on board.

The Eindhoven airfield fire service were not initially aware that the transport aircraft was carrying passengers. It was thirty minutes before they realised this, by which time most of the passengers had already died in the post-crash fire. Following the accident, the Royal Netherlands Air Force officer who commanded the Eindhoven airbase, the officer responsible for air traffic control and the officer commanding the fire department were relieved of their duties. The investigation established that the passenger information, which was listed on the flight plan, was not transmitted to the destination airport; the investigation recommended changes to that the flight plan procedure in light of the findings.

== Investigation ==
The cause of the accident was the ingestion of common starlings into the two left engines, which caused the plane to go out of control during landing.
