= Tepper Aviation =

Transport company

- Founded: 1987; 39 years ago
- Ceased operations: Renamed to Gulf Air Group and Pallas Aviation in 2017 onward
- Hubs: Bob Sikes Airport
- Headquarters: Crestview, Florida, United States

Tepper Aviation, Inc. (founded 1987, later known as Gulf Air Group and Pallas Aviation) was a Central Intelligence Agency front airline company known for a deadly plane crash in Angola in 1989, secretly carrying arms to UNITA insurgents, and involvement in extraordinary rendition in the 2000's.

Tepper was based at the Bob Sikes Airport in Crestview, Florida.

== History ==
The company was created after the exposure and dissolution of the CIA's previous and related front airline St. Lucia Airways after it was revealed to be involved in the Iran Contra Affair. In 1988, Tepper had taken all of the assets of St. Lucia Airways.

In the late 1980s and early 1990s, Tepper transported weapons and guerrillas to the UNITA insurgency in Angola. In the 2000's, the company was involved in and investigated for the CIA's extraordinary rendition and torture operations.

=== Angolan Civil War ===
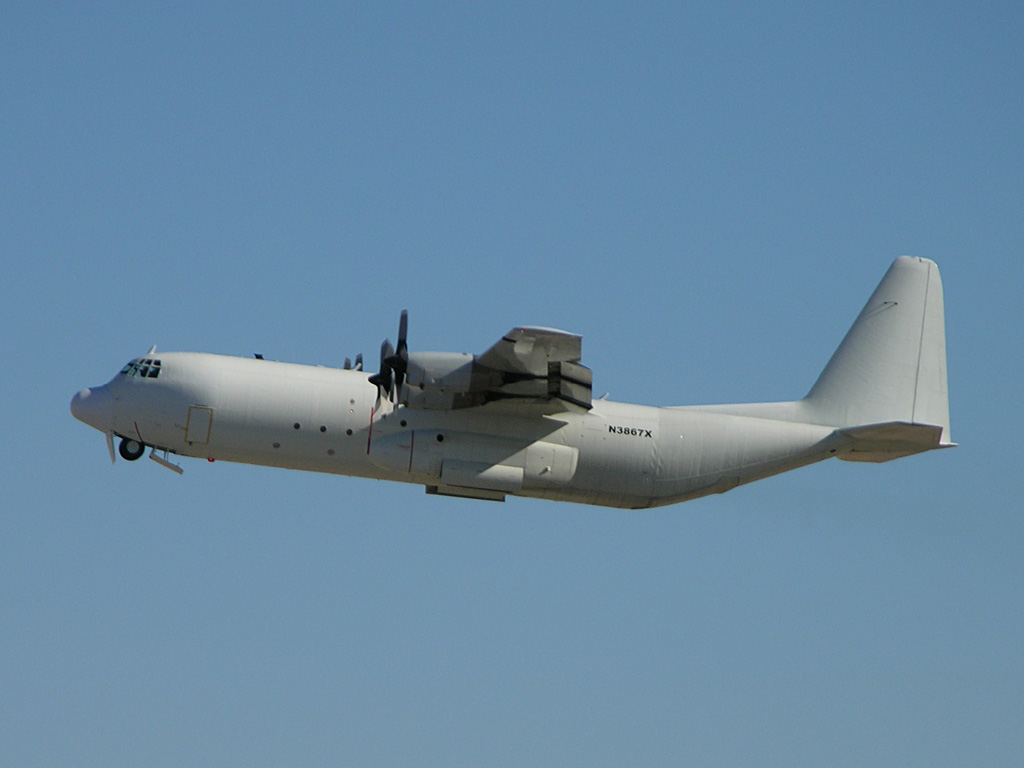
A Tepper Aviation Lockheed L-100-30 taking off from Mojave Spaceport, California

Tepper Aviation's existence as a CIA front company carrying weapons and guerrillas in the Angolan Civil War was widely reported in the national and international reporting of a deadly CIA plane crash in Angola in 1989.

In early 1989, the UK Independent reported Tepper's involvement in Angola:

The CIA has appointed a new airline to ferry weaponry to the US and South African-backed UNITA guerrillas fighting the Marxist MPLA government in Angola. The CIA's previous airline for this task was forced to close after media revelations. Tepper Aviation, based in Crestview, Florida, operates a Hercules freighter aircraft which, according to former employees, has flown between the Kamina air base in southern Zaire and UNITA-held territory in eastern Angola. Tepper was set up in late 1980, after the demise of the CIA's previous carrier, St. Lucia Airways, whose activities, in addition to the Angolan work, included the transport of Colonel North and weapons to Iran... Bud Petty, who heads Tepper, categorically denies that the Hercules has been in Zaire or Angola.

Petty died months later in the crash of Hercules aircraft N9205T in Angola, as reported by Flight International:

The Lockheed L-100 Hercules which crashed while on a US Central Intelligence Agency mission in Angola late last month was owned and operated by Tepper Aviation, a Florida-based company with a history of involvement with CIA operations. Bud Petty, the head of Tepper Aviation, was piloting the aircraft and was killed in the crash along with, at least two West Germans, a Briton and a second American. The aircraft, painted grey and known as the 'Grey Ghost', came down at night on 27 November as it was coming in to land at Jamba, the main base of the UNITA guerrillas fighting Angola's Marxist Government. The aircraft was carrying a cargo of weapons, plus several guerrillas, as well as the Europeans and Americans.

According to The Book of Honor by Ted Gup, Petty was the head of Tepper at the time:

The lumbering cargo plane that would take him into Angola was to be one of the 'Gray Ghosts,' so named for their slate-colored paint. The plane had four seats in the front -- for a pilot, copilot, navigator, and loadmaster. The fuselage was largely open for cargo. On board that night was a seasoned crew of six. Even by Agency standards, it had a distinctly international flavor. Heading the team was Pharies 'Bud' Petty, a veteran Agency pilot who, at least on paper, presided over a Florida firm called Tepper Aviation, located in Crestview, just off Eglin Air Force Base. The other crew members were all ostensibly employees of Tepper.

Gup's book identifies Gracie T. Petty as Petty's widow.

=== Extraordinary Rendition ===
In the 2000's, Tepper was involved in multiple different European investigations into US abductions and transport of prisoners subjected to torture and torture-like interrogations that experts believed violated international law. The larger situation at the time was referred to as "[possible] flying torture chambers circling over Europe," by Martin Schulz, a Social Democratic leader in the European Parliament.

- Italian Prosecutor Armando Spataro said that in February 2003 US agents kidnapped Imam Abu Omar in Milan, placed him on a jet operated by CIA airline Tepper Aviation, and sent him to Egypt via the US airbase in Ramstein, Germany.
- In 2005, the Council of Europe said it was investigating allegations that the CIA was using the company's aircraft for extraordinary rendition of suspected terrorists through Europe.
- In January 2003, the Austrian air force sent fighter jets to check on a suspicious plane flight (registration number N8183J) which was later revealed to be operated by Tepper Aviation and had taken off from the Rhine-Main Airbase in Frankfurt.
- In January 2006, a European Parliament investigation named Tepper among others as part of a network of planes and CIA airlines that transported prisoners repeatedly to countries known for torture and imprisonment without trial. The report led to a resolution that condemned extraordinary rendition and stated the CIA was responsible for "illegal seizure, removal, abduction, and detention of terrorist suspects" in Europe specifically and in violation of international law and fundamental human rights.
- In May 2006, the Irish Human Rights Commission named Tepper Aviation as one of several operators of airplanes suspected in human rights violations, and repeatedly invoked multiple overlapping laws against torture.

Tepper was part of a network of six US companies, including also Aero Contractors Limited, Pegasus Technologies, posing as general charter flight companies but operating airplanes that belonged to the CIA. The agency used the airplanes for the global war on terror, for example to move suspected Al-Qaida terrorists between secret prisons and other torture facilities.

=== Name Changes ===
On October 11, 2016, Tepper filed papers changing its name to Gulf Air Group, effective in 2017. In 2019, Gulf Air Group opened the Covington Maintenance Center at Southern Alabama Regional Airport in Andalusia, Alabama. In September 2024, Pallas Aviation, previously incorporated in Texas, filed for incorporation in Florida. The principal address was given as 5486 Fairchild Road, Hangar #7, Crestview FL, which is also the address of Gulf Air Group. In addition, the person authorized to manage and control Pallas was the president and CEO of Gulf Air Group.

== See also ==
- Aero Contractors (US)
- Air America
- List of defunct airlines of the United States
- Rendition aircraft
