= St. Lucia Airways =

Defunct airline based in Saint Lucia

St Lucia Airways
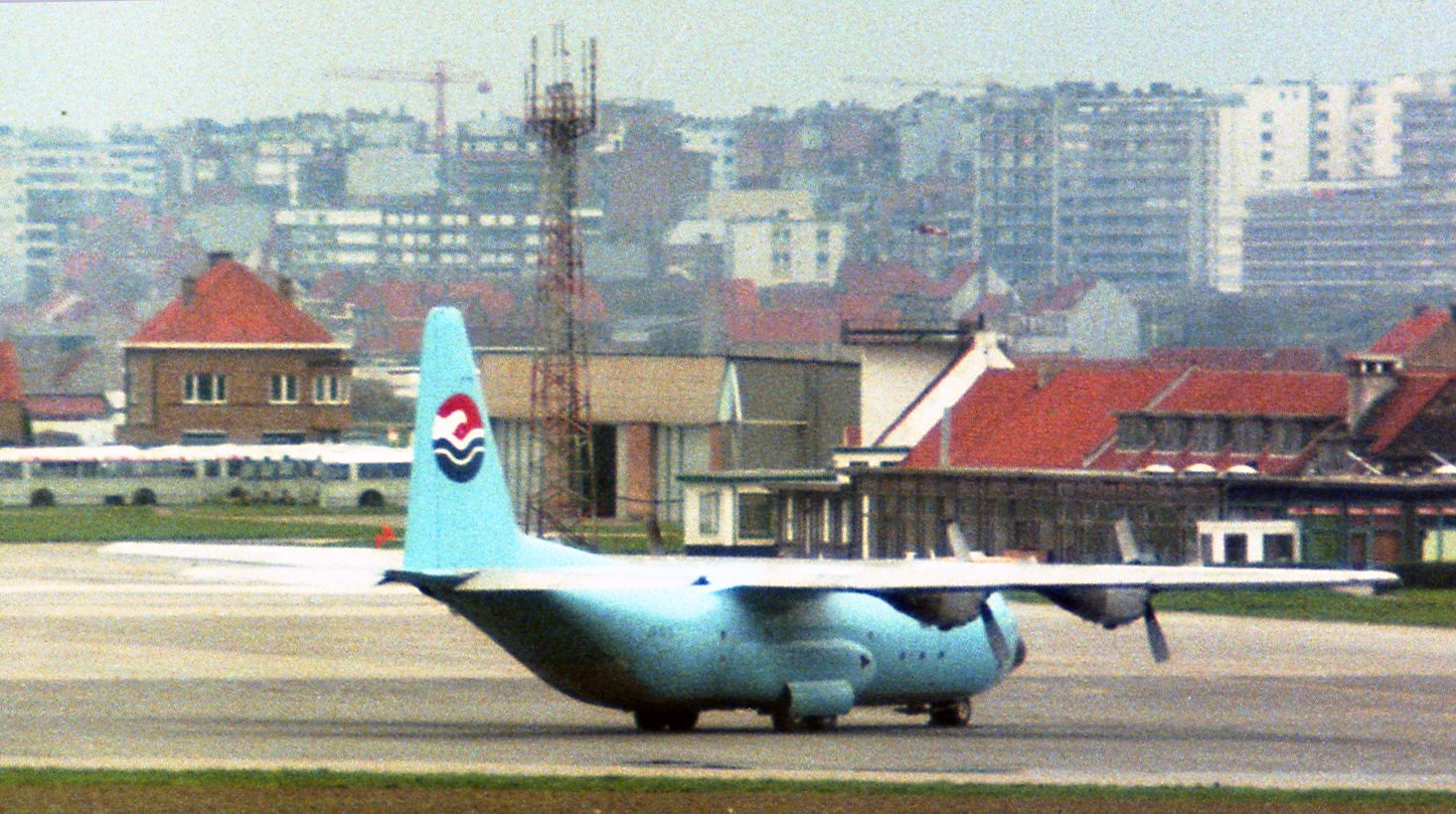
- St. Lucia Airways Lockheed L-100-20 Hercules
IATA	ICAO	Call sign
?	?	?
- Founded: 1975
- Ceased operations: 1984
- Fleet size: See Fleet
- Headquarters: PO Box 253, Castries

St. Lucia Airways Limited (founded 1975) was a small CIA front "proprietary" airline that ran secret air missions during the Iran–Contra affair and Angolan Civil War and was later dissolved into a different CIA front company Tepper Aviation.

Despite the company name, the airline had no official connection to St. Lucia. In 1987, the Prime Minister of St. Lucia, John Compton, stated that the airline and its supposed local owner were a front. He asked the company to change its name because of problems including an incident where Turkish authorities billed the St. Lucian government fees for CIA flights that carried Hawk missiles from Turkey to Tehran in the Iran–Contra affair. Compton said: "Call [the airline] something else. We are a small country. We don't want to have these kinds of international entanglements. We're too small."

The head office was listed as PO Box 253, Castries, St. Lucia, West Indies but was controlled by the Florida shell company Airline Consulting..

== History of CIA affiliation ==
Congressional records list St. Lucia Airways as a CIA front "proprietary" as of 1976 and the CIA ownership was reported in 1987 and 1988.

In the 1980's, company manager Dietrich Reinhardt denied any link between the company and the CIA or the U.S. government. But investigations into flights, the US Senate report on the Iran–Contra affair, and civilian sighting reports, made clear that the airline had flown repeatedly to various US military bases, had delivered weapons directly to Iran (and also via Israel), and flown CIA arms to UNITA.

In 1984 a lawyer named Michael Gordon reportedly bought the airline but its director was Reinhardt, a German residing in Florida. Airline staff in 1987 apparently falsely claimed that a local St. Lucian woman, Allison Lindo, owned the airline. At the same time, Michael Gordon said he owned the airline, while a friend of Lindo stated that Lindo had sold her interest to a German (presumably Dietrich Reinhardt) years before. A former employee complained that flight log books for maintenance were not available or accessible, unlike "every company in the world."

=== Angolan Civil War ===
St. Lucia Airways was reported to be secretly supplying UNITA in the Angolan Civil War.

Company director Dietrich Reinhardt said that he was a personal friend of UNITA leader Jonas Savimbi and had contacts with the CIA and the Angolan Group UNITA who was fighting the communist lead MPLA.

=== Iran–Contra affair ===
St. Lucia Airways was used during the Iran–Contra affair scandal.

During the 1986 arms for hostages scandal, U.S. Marine Corps Col. Oliver North arranged for shipments of Raytheon MIM-23 HAWK antiaircraft missiles to Israel. "The CIA's air branch suggested a proprietary which did clandestine work for the agency - St. Lucia Airways." The CIA congressional relations man, Clair George, was unavailable, so Duane Clarridge, the Latin America division chief, checked with the acting Deputy Director of Operations, Ed Juchniewicz, who told North that, in addition to its proprietary work, St. Lucia operated as a commercial venture. So it was available to anyone for special charter operations.

Bob Woodward reported:

North arranged for St. Lucia [Airways] to provide two Boeing 707s. They were able to carry HAWK antiaircraft missiles to Israel, where the HAWKs were transferred to Israeli planes for transit to Iran. North was running the operation through a Swiss bank account, Lake Resources, Inc. (number 386-430-22-1 at Crédit Suisse). For coming up with an airline on short notice, North told [Vice Adm. John] Poindexter on their interoffice computer, "Clarridge deserves a medal."

=== Connections with other front companies ===
In January 1988, the company and its assets were purchased by Tepper Aviation, a new CIA front company that shared the same staff and planes as St. Lucia Airways.

In 1982 the airline leased aircraft from Air Consulting which was a CIA front company specializing in international charter flights.

== Fleet ==
In 1975 the firm had

- One BN 2 Islander
- One Douglas DC 3

In 1980 the firm had

- Three BN 2 Islanders
- One Cessna 310

In 1982 the firm operated three aircraft.

- Britten-Norman BN-2A Islander, registration J6-LAS, formerly registered VQ-LAS
- Boeing 707-323C, registration J6-SLF, formerly registered G-WIND.
- Lockheed L-100-20 registration J6-SLO, formerly registered C-FPWN

== Alleged commercial service ==
General and tourist flights were operated mainly to Martinique and Barbados, but also extended throughout the Caribbean and South America. Shuttle service supposedly existed between the two St. Lucia airports of Vigie and Hewannora, and to Castries and neighboring islands.

== See also ==
- Air America
- Civil Air Transport
- Aero Contractors (United States)
- Rendition aircraft
- Southern Air Transport
- Tepper Aviation
- Evergreen International Aviation
- Intermountain Aviation
