= 253 Squadron =

253 Squadron may refer to:

- No. 253 Squadron RAF
- VMGRT-253, USMC
- 253 Squadron (Israel), Israeli Air Force
