= VMGR-352 =

Marine Aerial Refueler Transport Squadron 352
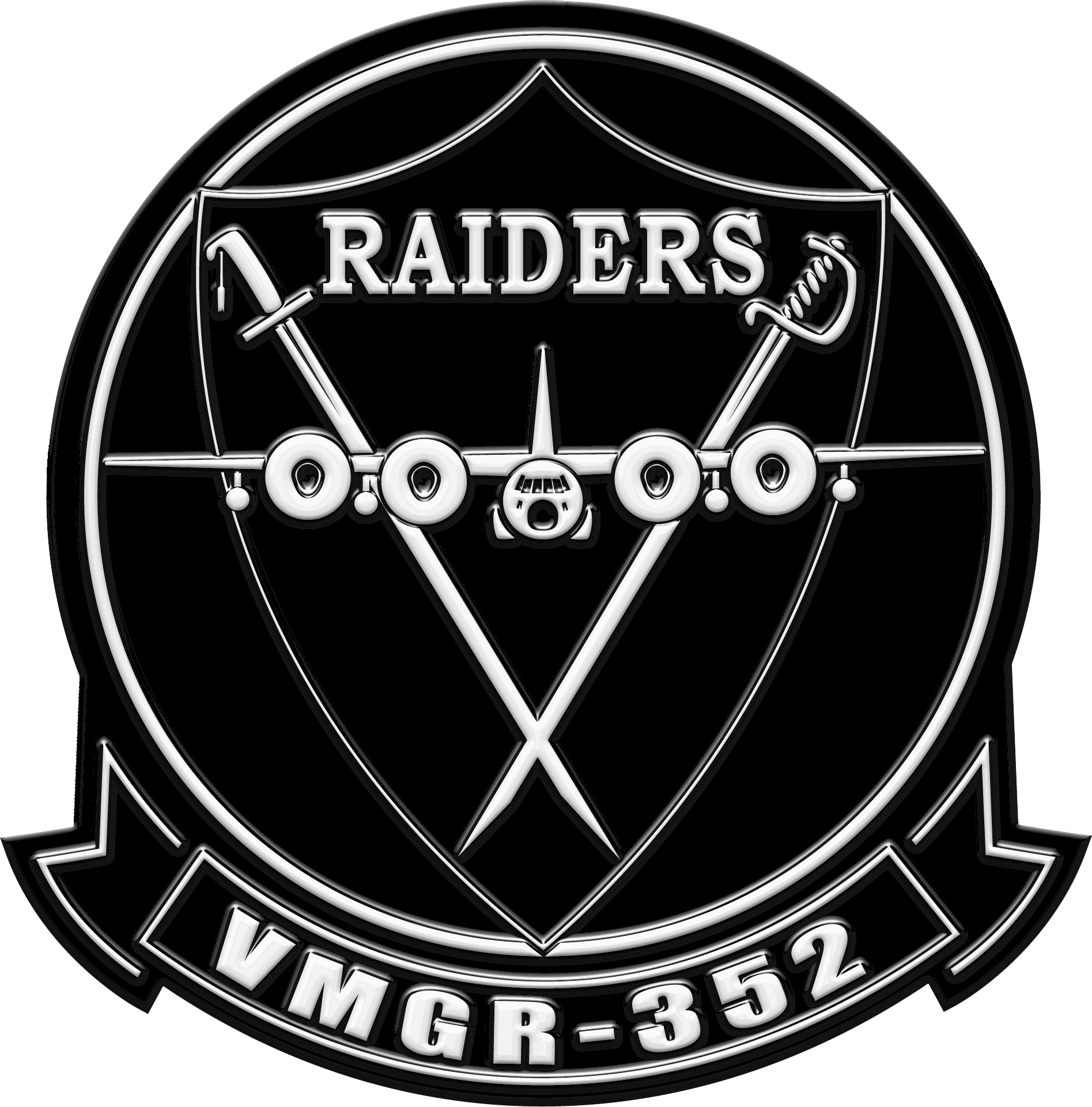
- VMGR-352 insignia
- Active: 1 April 1943 - present
- Country: United States
- Allegiance: United States of America
- Branch: United States Marine Corps
- Type: Cargo Transport / Aerial refueling
- Role: Assault support
- Part of: Marine Aircraft Group 11; 3rd Marine Aircraft Wing
- Garrison/HQ: Marine Corps Air Station Miramar
- Nickname: "Raiders"
- Tail Code: QB
- Engagements: World War II; Korean War; Vietnam War; Operation Desert Storm; Operation Enduring Freedom; Operation Iraqi Freedom
- Website: Official website

Commanders
- Current commander: LtCol Blake "BDL" Jansen

Marine Aerial Refueler Transport Squadron 352 (VMGR-352) is a United States Marine Corps KC-130J squadron. They are a part of Marine Aircraft Group 11 (MAG-11), 3rd Marine Aircraft Wing (3rd MAW) and provide both fixed-wing and rotary-wing aerial refueling capabilities to support Fleet Marine Force (FMF) air operations in addition to assault air transport of personnel, equipment, and supplies. The squadron, known as the "Raiders", is stationed at Marine Corps Air Station Miramar, California.

== History ==
=== World War II, Korea & Vietnam ===
Formed as Marine Utility Squadron 352 (VMJ-352) at MCAS Cherry Point on 1 April 1943. The squadron was originally assigned the Douglas R4D Skytrain aircraft, which it retained until its designation as Marine Transport Squadron 352 (VMR-352) in June 1944. In February 1945, part of the squadron moved to MCAS Ewa, Oahu, Hawaii and re-equipped with Curtiss R5C-1s (the US Navy designation for the Curtiss C-46 Commando), with the rest of the squadron following with its R4Ds. From July that year, Douglas R5D Skymaster began to replace the squadrons R4Ds. It remained at Ewa until 1949. Film legend Tyrone Power was a member of the squadron for several months during 1944.

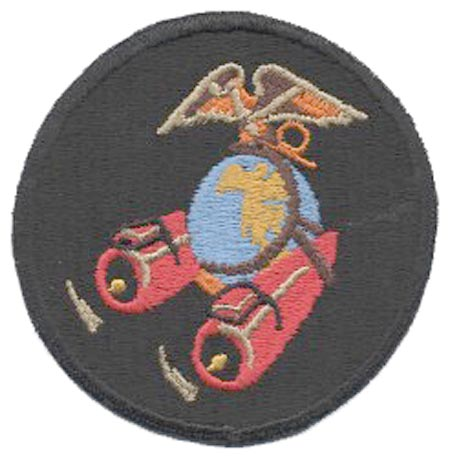
Official squadron logo during WWII when they were VMJ/VMR-352

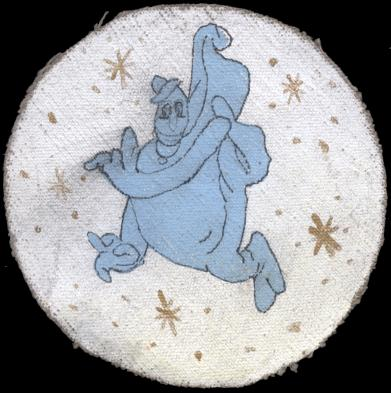
Squadron logo designed by Disney during WWII when they were VMJ/VMR-352

Based in Hawaii, the squadron conducted training and provided operational support in the Pacific Theater, and was assigned the Commander of Military Transport Service in support of the Berlin Airlift in 1948 and 1949.

After moving to Marine Corps Air Station El Toro, California in December 1949 the squadron was called upon to support air operations associated with the Korean War. The squadron's mission was extended with its re-designation as Marine Aerial Refueler Transport Squadron 352 (VMGR-352) in March 1961 with the arrival of the KC-130 Hercules. The squadron conducted its first TransPac operations in January 1962, moving 18 F8U's of VMF-451 from MCAS El Toro to MCAS Iwakuni, Japan. The "Raiders" rapid response capability and versatile aircraft were called upon during the Cuban Missile Crisis in 1962 and again in the Dominican Republic in 1965. In April 1962 the squadron began supporting operations in Vietnam with missions to haul materials used to build up Soc Trang (located Southeast of Saigon) as a base for helicopter combat operations. The squadron continued deploying elements in support of combat operations in the Republic of Vietnam until October 1972.

=== Gulf War and the 1990s ===
From August 1990 to March 1991, a seven plane detachment from the squadron flew in support of Operation Desert Shield and Operation Desert Storm. During the seven-month period, 352 Forward amassed over 2500 combat flight hours and 1144 sorties.

Beginning in 1992, VMGR-352 had several deployments to Kenya supporting Operation Restore Hope in next-door Somalia. The Raider's original mission was to fly food and supplies to war-torn Somalia. This later turned into a combat support mission supporting the 11th Marine Expeditionary Unit (11th MEU) and ended with the evacuation of the US Embassy.

In February 1998, the "Raiders" were tasked to be a part of the United Nations' relief effort, Operation Noble Response in Kenya, Africa. Later, in June 1998, they executed a non-combatant evacuation operation, Operation Safe Departure in Eritrea, Africa.

In early January 1999, the Raiders deployed a four-plane detachment to Mombassa, Kenya to extract American citizens and foreign nationals from Eritrea and Ethiopia, Africa in support of the 13th Marine Expeditionary Unit (13th MEU) AND Operation Safe Departure. Though the crisis did not escalate to the point where Marines were required to conduct a NEO, the Raiders provided the 13th MEU with support during operations "Eager Mace" in Kenya and "Native Fury" in Kuwait. On 15 April 1999, VMGR-352 moved their squadron from Marine Corps Air Station El Toro, California to MCAS Miramar as part of the Base Realignment and Closure (BRAC) commission mandates.

On 28 June 1999, the Raiders were tasked with supporting Operation Northern Watch by providing helicopter aerial refueling (HAR) for the 66th Expeditionary Rescue Squadron (ARQS) in Incirlik Air Base, Turkey. After the tragic earthquakes in Turkey, the Raider detachment became an integral part of the humanitarian relief effort that provided care and basic life necessities to the thousands of victims of those earthquakes. During the humanitarian relief missions to northern Turkey, VMGR-352 continued their Operation Northern Watch support, and still flew over fifty missions. In August, the Raiders were called upon to provide support to Joint Task Force Dora. Due to Hurricane Dora's impending assault on the Johnston Atoll, a hurricane evacuation mission from Johnston Island to Hawaii was initiated. Less than two days after notification, the Raiders had returned all military and DoD employees to Johnston Island.

During February 2000, VMGR-352 launched a two-plane detachment to Ahmad al-Jaber Air Base in Kuwait to support Operation Southern Watch. While in-theater, they provided fixed-wing aerial refueling (FWAR) support to VMFA(AW)-121 in defense of the Southern Iraq No-Fly Zone, as well as FWAR support for Combat Search and Rescue (CSAR) missions, should it be needed.

=== Global war on terror ===
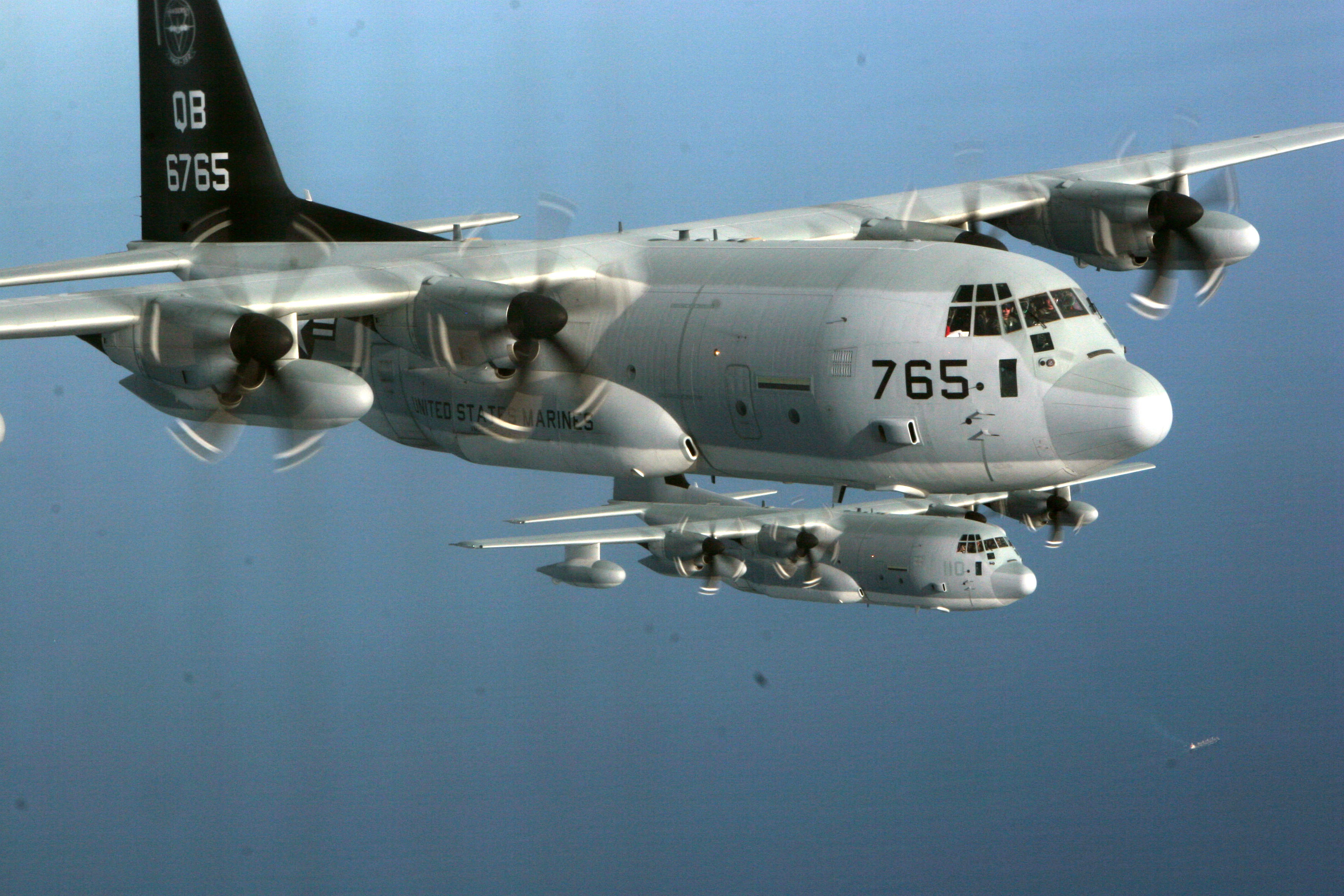
VMGR-352 fly two KC-130Js in a training exercise, February 2007.

In November 2001, VMGR-352 deployed to Afghanistan in support of Operation Enduring Freedom. The "Raiders" provided fixed wing aerial refueling and logistical support to forces fighting the war on terrorism. On 9 January 2002 aircraft 160021 Callsign "RAIDR 04" from VMGR-352, crashed into a mountainside in Pakistan killing all seven crewmembers. One of the Marines killed was Sergeant Jeannette L. Winters. She was the first female service member to die in the war on terror.

The squadron once again deployed to Bahrain to participate in Operation Iraqi Freedom, providing aerial refueling and assault support to coalition forces. During this operation, VMGR-352 was augmented by VMGR-234 and VMGR-452 to form the largest assemblage of KC-130s in history.

VMGR-352 began its transition to the KC-130J in August 2004. The newest model of the C-130 features an all-glass cockpit, digital flight-management system, and reduced crew requirements. As of late 2007, VMGR-352 only flies the KC-130J, with all older models having left the unit.

On September 29, 2020, KC-130J BUNO 166765, Callsign RAIDR Five Zero (50) collided with an F-35, Callsign VOLT Nine Three (93), while conducting aerial refueling in support of Weapons and Tactics Instruction Course at MCAS Yuma, AZ. The F-35 slammed into the right side of the aircraft, taking out both engines and propellers and heavily damaging the landing gear. The pilot of the F-35 successfully ejected and the jet slammed into the ground near the Salton Sea. The crew of the KC-130 were able to control the aircraft and make a crash landing in a cauliflower field just short of the runway at Thermal, CA. The crew walked away from the crash.

The Raiders deployed once again in February 2006 in support of Operation Iraqi Freedom in cooperation with sister squadron VMGR-252, based at MCAS Cherry Point, North Carolina.

The Raiders have been constantly deployed in support of the Global War on Terror. Marine Corps KC-130 squadrons are unique in that they do not deploy as an entire squadron, but send detachments (Dets) in support of operations. Every 6–7 months, det personnel were rotated keeping a constant presence in both Iraq and Afghanistan as well as deploying in support of various Marine Expeditionary Units.

Raiders can be seen worldwide conducting operations as directed by higher headquarters - from supporting other units in movements across both the Pacific and Atlantic to supporting Marines deployed in Iraq and Afghanistan.

=== Harvest HAWK ===
VMGR-352 was the first squadron to employ the Harvest HAWK, the Marine Corps version of an armed KC-130. With the addition of the ISR / Weapon Mission Kit, the KC-130J is able to serve as an overwatch aircraft and delivers close air support in the form of Hellfire missiles and precision-guided bombs. This capability, designated as "Harvest HAWK" (Hercules Airborne Weapons Kit), can be used in scenarios where precision is not a requisite, such as area denial.

The Harvest Hawk weapons system for USMC KC-130J aircraft began its first deployment during October 2010 in Afghanistan with VMGR-352. Its first weapons engagement was on 4 November supporting the 3rd Battalion, 5th Marine Regiment, in Sangin. One Hellfire missile was fired and five enemy insurgents were killed. The battle damage assessment stated there were no civilian casualties or property damage during the fire fight. Since this date hundreds of engagements have taken place using the Harvest HAWK.

== Humanitarian ==
In addition to its numerous combat deployments and international humanitarian aid efforts, VMGR-352 answered its own country's call for assistance in the wake of Hurricane Katrina's ravage of the Gulf Coast in September 2005. Flying day and night to deliver aid in the form of supplies and military personnel to the area, the Raiders were an integral part of a massive logistical effort by the Armed Forces of the United States.

After the 2010 Pakistan floods, KC-130Js from USMC VMGR-352 squadron delivered over 90,000 kg (200,000 lbs) of cargo across Pakistan in support of flood relief efforts.

== Awards ==
The squadron has received numerous awards throughout its history and rates the following battle streamers: Navy Unit Commendation with two Bronze Stars, Meritorious Unit Commendation with Four Bronze Stars, Joint Meritorious Unit Award, American Campaign, Asiatic-Pacific Campaign, World War Two Victory, National Defense Medal with three Bronze Stars, Korean Service, Vietnam Service with three Silver Stars and one Bronze Star, and the Southwest Asia Service with two Bronze Stars.

== Safety Record ==
VMGR-352 also has two presentations of the Commandant's Aviation Efficiency Trophy as the premier Squadron in the Marine Corps, and six CNO Aviation Safety Awards. In June 1999 VMGR-352 surpassed 180,000 class A mishap free flight hours.

== Movie credit ==
VMGR 352's insignia can be seen in the ending of the 1986 movie Heartbreak Ridge. It is visible as Clint Eastwood walks off into the sunset with his love interest Marsha Mason after returning from a successful mission in Grenada rescuing students.

== See also ==
- United States Marine Corps Aviation
- List of active United States Marine Corps aircraft squadrons
- List of decommissioned United States Marine Corps aircraft squadrons
