= 2017 United States Marine Corps KC-130 crash =

US Marine Corps aircraft that crashed in 2017

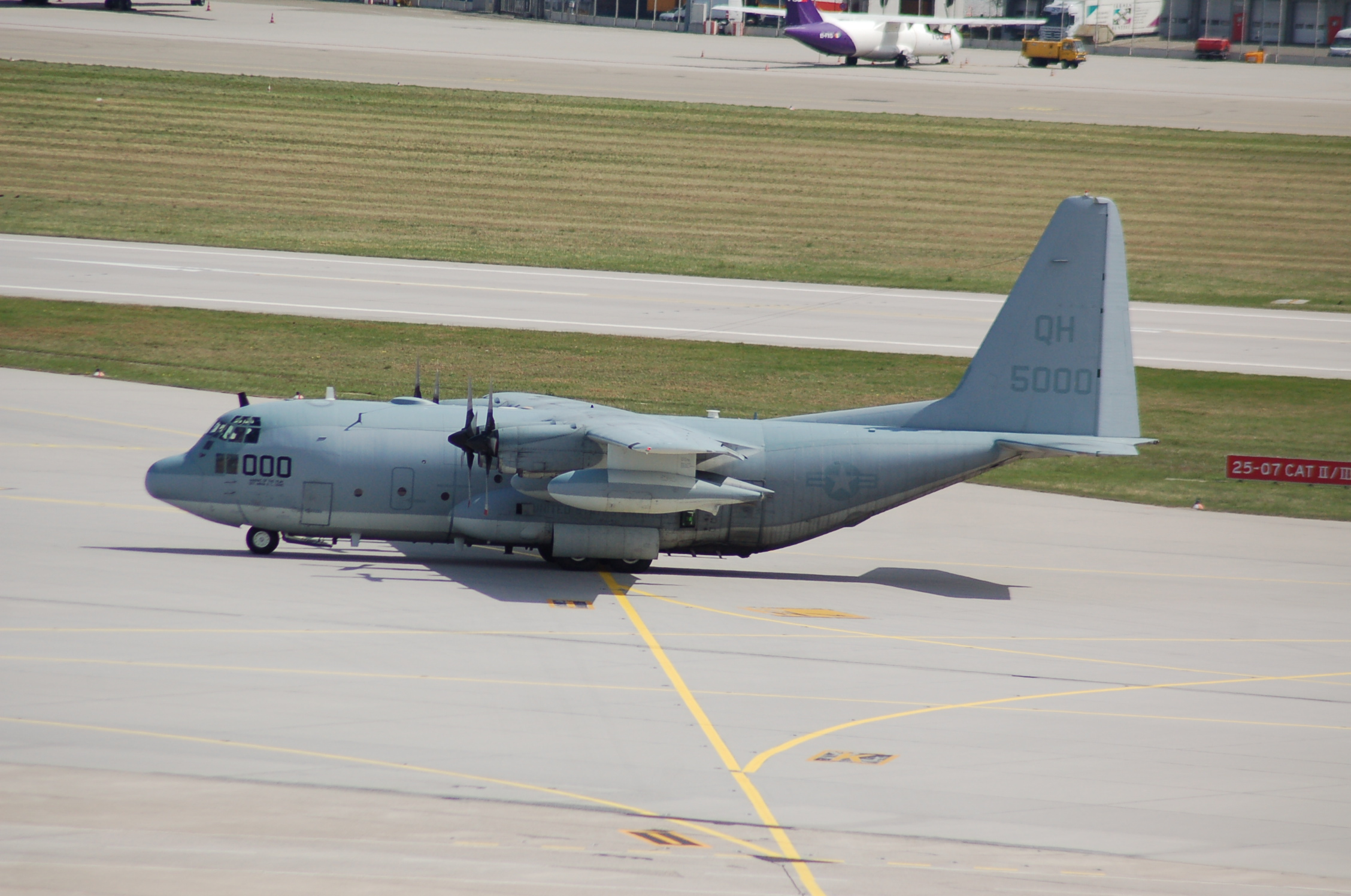
- 165000, the aircraft involved in 2012

Accident
- Date: 10 July 2017
- Summary: In-flight breakup at cruise altitude due to improper maintenance
- Site: Leflore County, Mississippi, United States; 33.449°N 90.437°W

Aircraft
- Aircraft type: Lockheed KC-130T Hercules
- Operator: United States Marine Corps
- Call sign: YANKY 72
- Registration: 165000
- Flight origin: Marine Corps Air Station Cherry Point, North Carolina
- Destination: Naval Air Facility El Centro, California
- Occupants: 16
- Passengers: 7
- Crew: 9
- Fatalities: 16
- Survivors: 0

On 10 July 2017, a Lockheed KC-130T Hercules aircraft belonging to the United States Marine Corps (USMC) crashed in Leflore County, Mississippi, killing all 16 people on board. The aircraft had the call sign "Yanky 72" and was from Marine Aerial Refueler Transport Squadron 452 (VMGR-452) based at Stewart Air National Guard Base, New York. Debris from the aircraft was found in Leflore County, Mississippi.

The crash is the deadliest Marine Corps disaster since 2005, when a U.S. Marine Corps Sikorsky CH-53E Super Stallion helicopter crashed in Iraq, killing 31 people.

== Aircraft ==
The aircraft involved was a Lockheed KC-130T Hercules tanker/transport of the United States Marine Corps built in 1993, with Bureau Number (BuNo.) 165000. The aircraft was nicknamed Triple Nuts because of the abbreviated number "000" on its nose. The aircraft was initially delivered to the United States Air Force in 1993 and later was transferred to the United States Navy and then assigned to the U.S. Marine Corps. It was damaged on the ground during a storm on 1 June 2004 at Naval Air Station Joint Reserve Base Fort Worth, Texas. As a result of the storm, it was flipped onto its port wingtip, damaging a refueling pod. It was quickly repaired and placed back into service.

== Accident ==
The flight took off from Cherry Point at 14:07 EDT, with the callsign "Yanky 72." The aircraft was en route to Naval Air Facility El Centro in California. At 15:49:24 EDT, the crew made a routine transmission to Memphis ARTCC, after that, nothing more was heard from the flight. Radar contact was abruptly lost minutes later. After nine unsuccessful attempts by Memphis ARTCC to reach the aircraft, another flight reported seeing a plume of smoke. The plane had apparently crashed 85 miles (137 km) north of Jackson, Mississippi, killing all sixteen occupants. Brigadier General Bradley James said immediately after the accident, "Indications are something went wrong at cruise altitude." The aircraft was also reported to have been carrying weapons and ammunition. Debris was spread in a 5-mile (8 km) radius from the crash site and firefighters attending the crash site used 4,000 US gallons (3,300 imp gal; 15,000 L) of foam to extinguish the post-crash fire. Witnesses reported seeing the aircraft on fire with a smoking engine and descending in a flat spin.

== Investigation ==
According to the accident report published by the USMC, the accident was caused by improper repairs conducted in 2011 on a corroded propeller blade. While the aircraft was not equipped with a Flight Data Recorder or a Cockpit Voice Recorder, investigators were able to determine through available evidence and engineering data that the blade belonging to the inner-left engine failed while the aircraft was cruising at 20,000 feet (6,096 m). It passed through the left side of the fuselage and embedded itself in the inner-right wall of the passenger compartment. The blade striking the fuselage created a shock that traveled through the aircraft and caused the propeller and part of the reduction gearbox from the inner-right engine to separate and impact the right forward fuselage, "momentarily embedded into the upper right section," before striking and removing most of the right horizontal stabilizer. The forward fuselage, including the flight deck, separated at a point 19 feet (6 m) forward of the leading edge of the wingbox. The remains of the fuselage section ahead of the wingbox was then quickly torn apart by aerodynamic forces, after which the remains of the aircraft rapidly descended to the ground.

== Memorial ==
On 14 July 2018. a memorial located near the crash site in Leflore County was dedicated to the fallen. Part of the stretch of U.S. Highway 82 that ran through the crash site was also renamed YANKY 72 Memorial Highway.

== See also ==
- Lists of accidents and incidents involving military aircraft
