= Lockheed Martin KC-130 =

Aerial refueling tanker based on Lockheed Martin C-130

KC-130
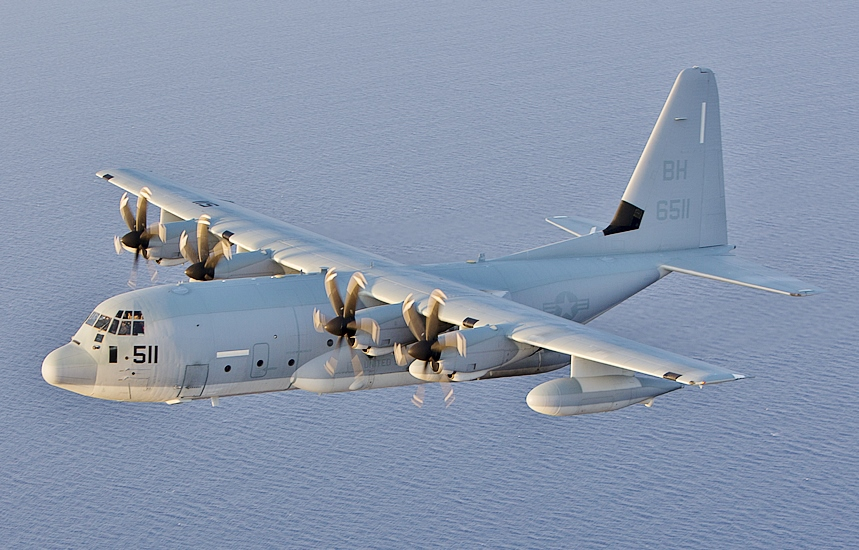
- KC-130J from VMGR-252, 2014

General information
- Type: Tanker (aircraft) / Transport, Overwatch / Ground support (Harvest HAWK variant)
- National origin: United States
- Manufacturer: Lockheed; Lockheed Martin
- Status: Active
- Primary users: United States Marine Corps Royal Canadian Air Force
- Number built: KC-130B: 6 KC-130F: 46; KC-130H: 33; KC-130R: 14; KC-130T: 28; KC-130J: 53

History
- Introduction date: KC-130F: 1962; KC-130R: 1976; KC-130T: 1983; KC-130J: April 2004
- Retired: KC-130F (2006); KC-130R (2007); KC-130T (2021)
- Developed from: Lockheed C-130 Hercules; Lockheed Martin C-130J Super Hercules
- Developed into: Lockheed Martin HC-130J; Lockheed Martin MC-130J

The Lockheed Martin (previously Lockheed) KC-130 is a family of the extended-range tanker version of the C-130 Hercules transport aircraft. The KC-130J is the latest variant operated by the United States Marine Corps (USMC), with 74 delivered out of 83 ordered as of 31 December 2023. It replaced older KC-130F, KC-130R, and KC-130T variants for aerial refueling. USMC reserve unit, VMGR-452 operated 12 KC-130T aircraft until May 2021; this was the last USMC reserve unit that operated the legacy KC-130s, completing the Corps' transition to the more advanced Super Hercules.

== Development ==
The KC-130F made its first test flight in January 1960 as the GV-1 under the old Navy designation system. First entering service in 1962, the KC-130F was designed to undertake aerial refueling missions in support of USMC aircraft. It was developed from the Lockheed C-130 Hercules.

The newest version, the KC-130J, shares fifty-five percent of the same airframe as preceding models, but has major improvements. It is based on the Lockheed Martin C-130J Super Hercules and provides significant increases in operational capability and performance margins over preceding KC-130F/R/T (legacy) aircraft. Additionally, the KC-130J reduces cost of ownership through system reliability and reduced maintenance man-hours per flight hour.

The new HC-130J combat rescue tanker and MC-130J special operations tanker are both derived from a KC-130J baseline.

Technological development has led to the incorporation of interior/exterior night vision lighting, night vision goggle head-up displays, global positioning system, and jam-resistant radios. Some KC-130s are also equipped with defensive electronic and infrared countermeasures systems.

== Design ==
The KC-130 is a multi-role, multi-mission tactical tanker/transport which provides the refueling support required by the USMC for its aircraft. This versatile asset provides in-flight refueling to both tactical aircraft and helicopters within a 500-nautical-mile (930 km) operating radius, as well as rapid ground refueling when required. Additional tasks performed are aerial delivery of troops and cargo, emergency resupply into unimproved landing zones within the objective or battle area, emergency medical evacuation, tactical insertion of combat troops and equipment, and evacuation missions.

=== KC-130J ===
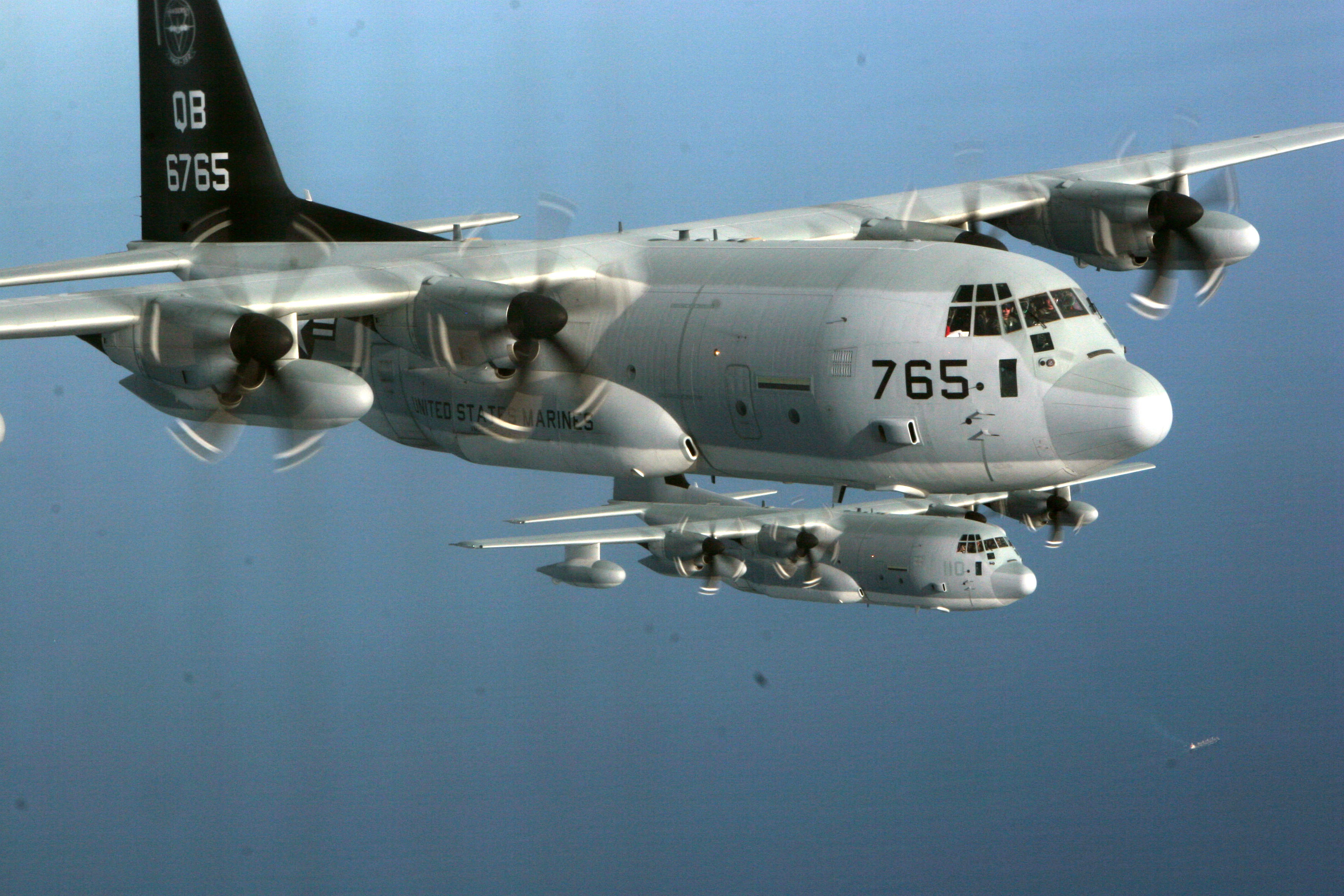
KC-130Js from VMGR-352

The KC-130J offers a 27,215 kg (60,000 lb) fuel capacity that it can allocate between its own flight requirements against aerial refueling offload capacity using its wing and external tanks while in the air. When more fuel is needed, an additional 11,064 kg (24,392 lb) of fuel can be offloaded from a specially configured internal fuselage 13,627 L (3,600-gallon) aluminum fuel tank. The system also functions without the fuselage tank, so the cargo compartment can be used for cargo on the same mission, giving the aircraft even greater flexibility.

The aircraft is ready to fuel fixed-wing, tilt-rotor, or rotary-wing aircraft using the standard probe and drogue technique. The two wing-mounted hose and drogue refueling pods (made by Sargent Fletcher) can each transfer up to 300 gallons (1,136 L) per minute to two aircraft simultaneously, allowing for rapid cycle times of multiple-receiver aircraft formations, a typical tanker formation of four aircraft in less than 30 minutes.

The KC-130J also provides for rapid ground refueling of helicopters, vehicles and fuel caches. The aircraft has a unique propeller feathering feature (known as "hotel mode", derived from the term hotel electric power, when a vessel or other means of transport is equipped with a power plant with the sole purpose of generating electric power for lighting, etc., rather than propulsion) which can slow (at 25% rotation speed) the propellers while the turbines continue to run and energize the generator, providing power to the electric fuel pumps. This reduction of the propellers' speed helps to eliminate prop wash behind the KC-130J. This allows ground forces to operate in relative calm while the aircraft offloads up to 2,271 L, 1,823 kg (600 gallons, 4,018 pounds) per minute.

The U.S. Marine Corps has chosen the KC-130J to replace its aging KC-130 legacy tanker fleet. The new KC-130J offers increased utility and much needed improvement in mission performance. As a force multiplier, the J-model tanker is capable of refueling both fixed- and rotary-wing aircraft as well as conducting rapid ground refueling. The refueling speed envelope has been widened from 100 to 270 knots (120 to 310 mph; 190 to 500 km/h) indicated airspeed, offering more capability and flexibility. Offload rates per refueling pod can be up to 300 gallons (1,136 L) per minute simultaneously. The KC-130's offload is significantly greater than previous Hercules tankers. As an example, at 1,000 nautical miles (1,852 km), the fuel offload is well over 45,000 pounds (20,412 kg).

=== Harvest HAWK ===
With the addition of the Marine Corps's ISR / Weapon Mission Kit, the KC-130J will be able to serve as an overwatch aircraft and can deliver ground support fire in the form of Hellfire or Griffin missiles, precision-guided bombs, and eventually 30mm cannon fire in a later upgrade. This capability, designated as "Harvest HAWK" (Hercules Airborne Weapons Kit), can be used in scenarios where precision is not a requisite, such as area denial.

The AN/AAQ-30 Target Sight System (TSS) integrates an infrared and television camera, and is mounted under the left wing's external fuel tank. It is the same TSS used on the upgraded AH-1Z Viper attack helicopter. The typical loadout is four Hellfire missiles and 10 Griffin GPS guided missiles. The weapons systems operator uses a Fire Control Console mounted on an HCU-6/E pallet in the KC-130J's cargo compartment.

The aircraft retains its original capabilities in refueling and transportation. The entire system can be removed in less than a day if necessary. The USAF MC-130W Dragon Spear program uses a similar concept.

The USMC plans to acquire three kits per active-duty KC-130J squadron for a total of nine kits, each costing up to US$22 million. It was first test flown on 29 August 2009 by VX-20, and first deployed in October 2010 with VMGR-352.

In 2026, Marines confirmed the kit has been retired, however the exact time of the kit being retired is unclear.

The Lockheed Martin KC-130J Harvest HAWK components and operation

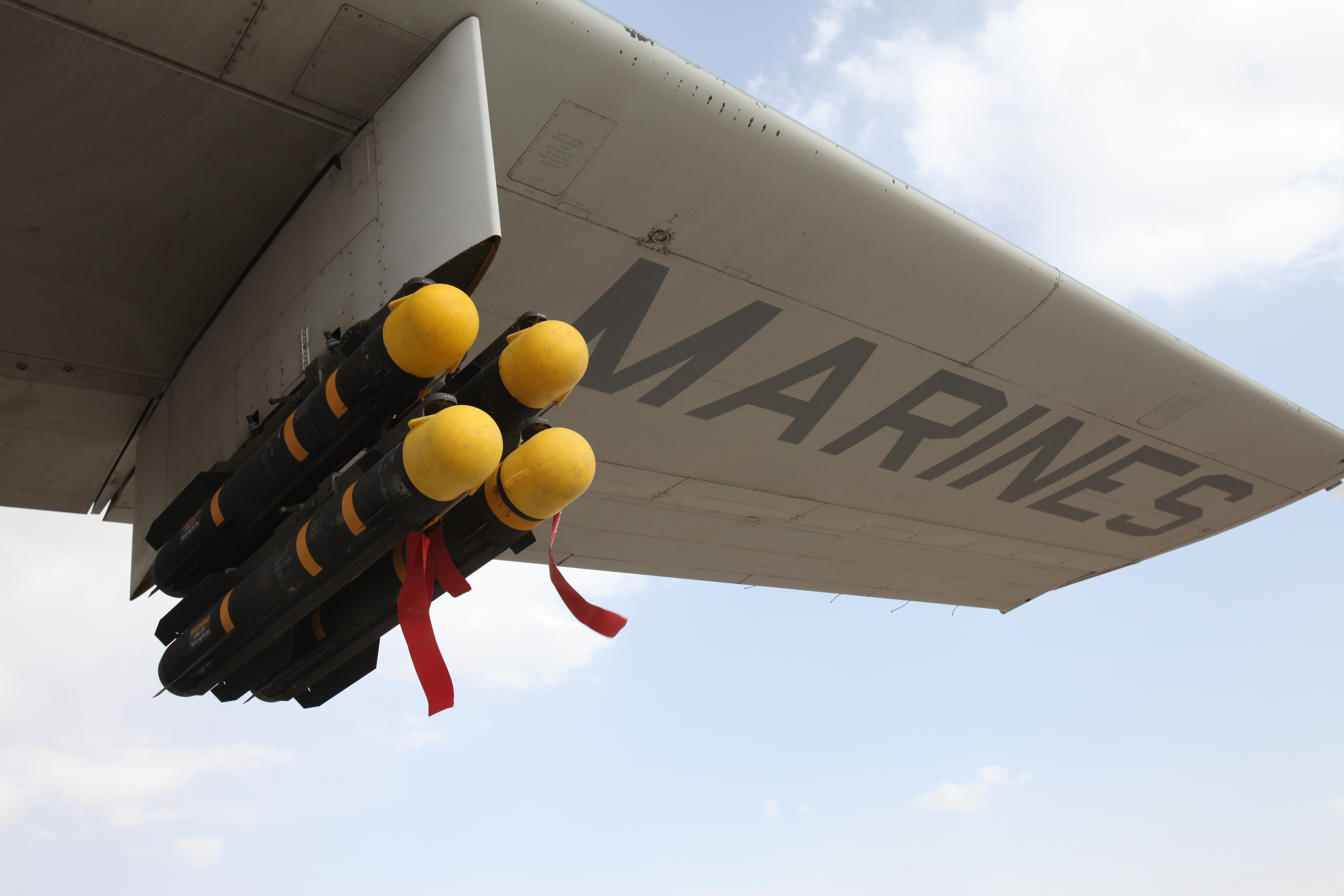
Hellfire missile wing pylon launcher

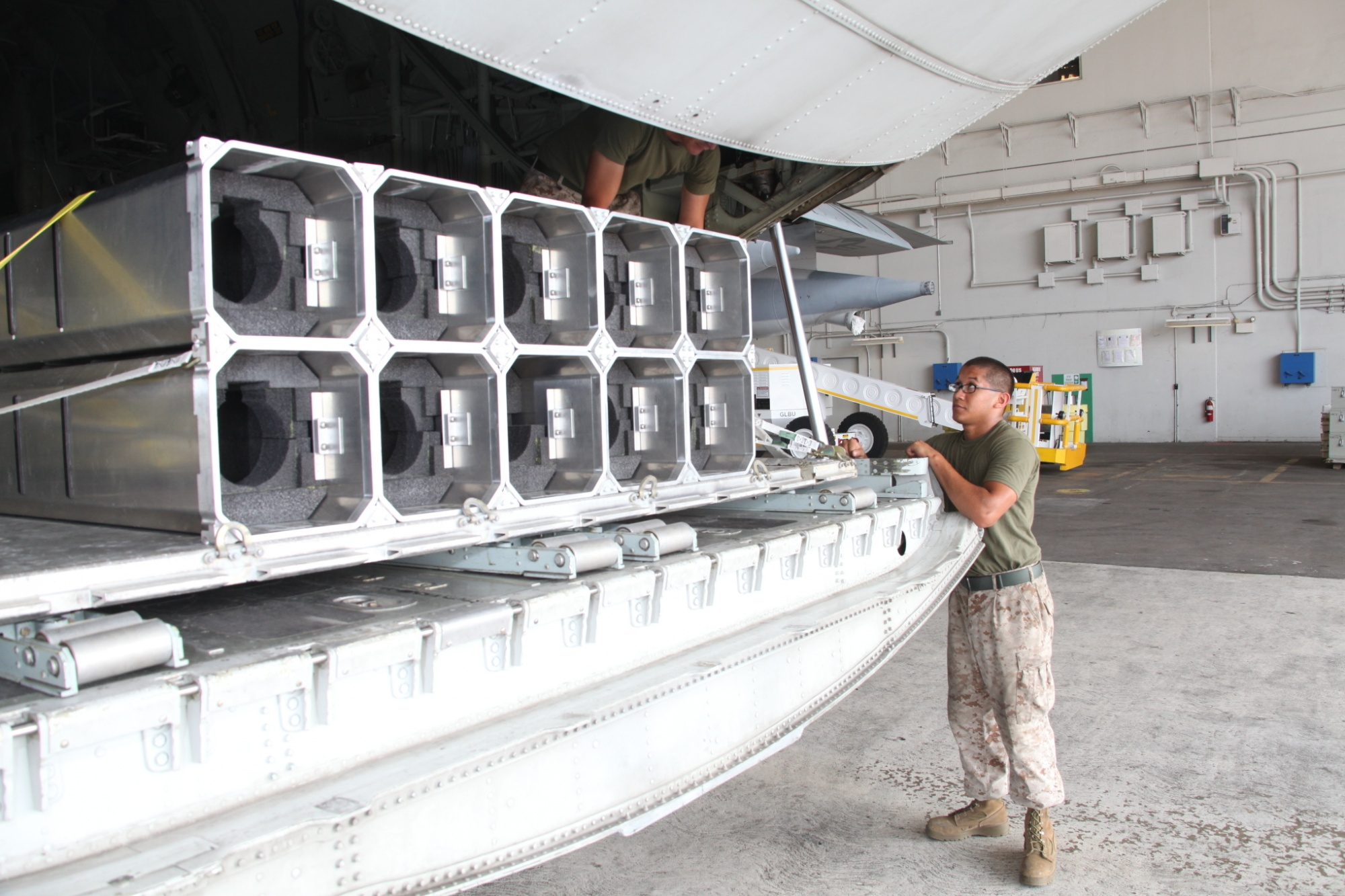
Griffin missile ramp launcher

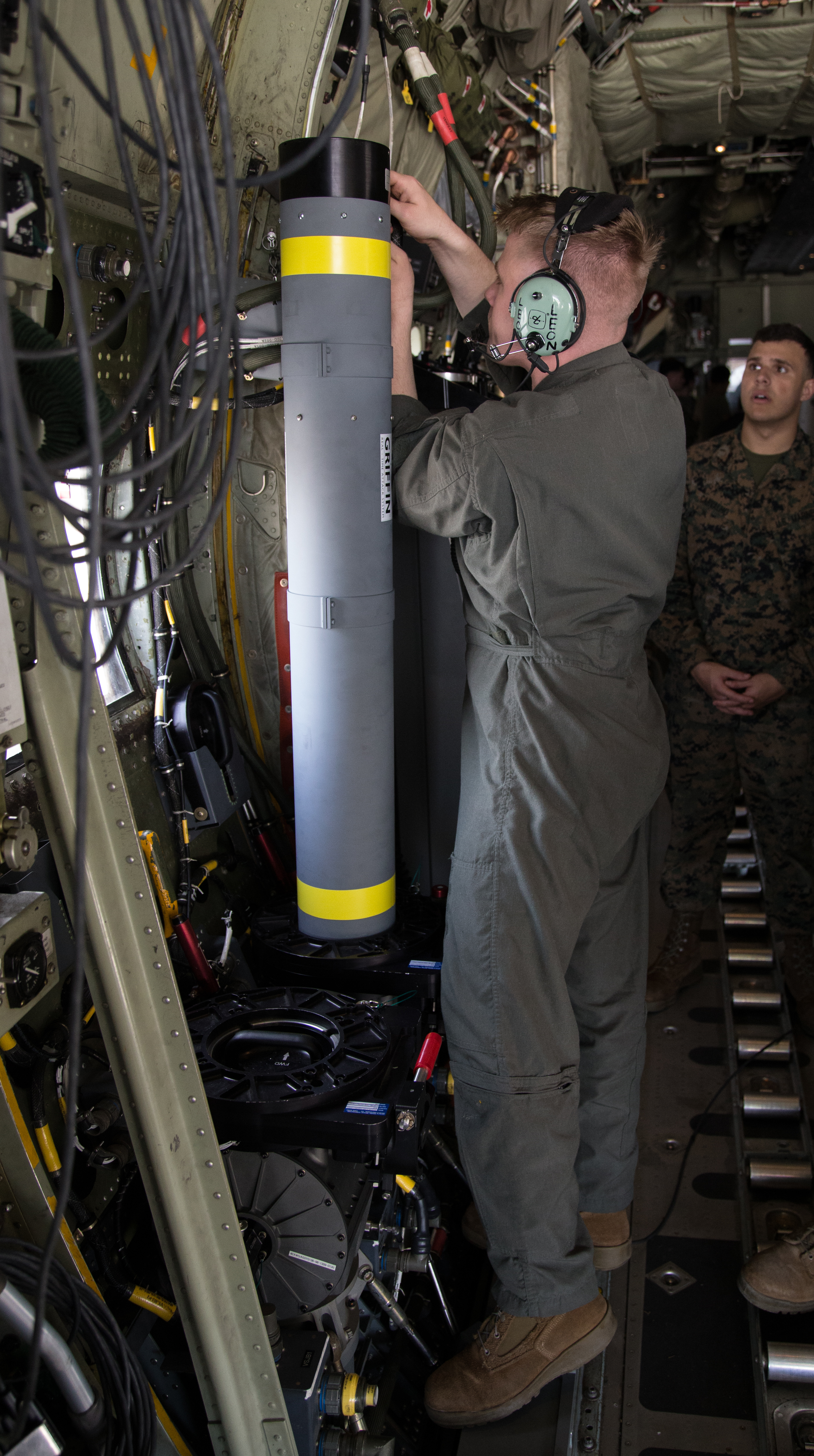
Griffin missile door launcher

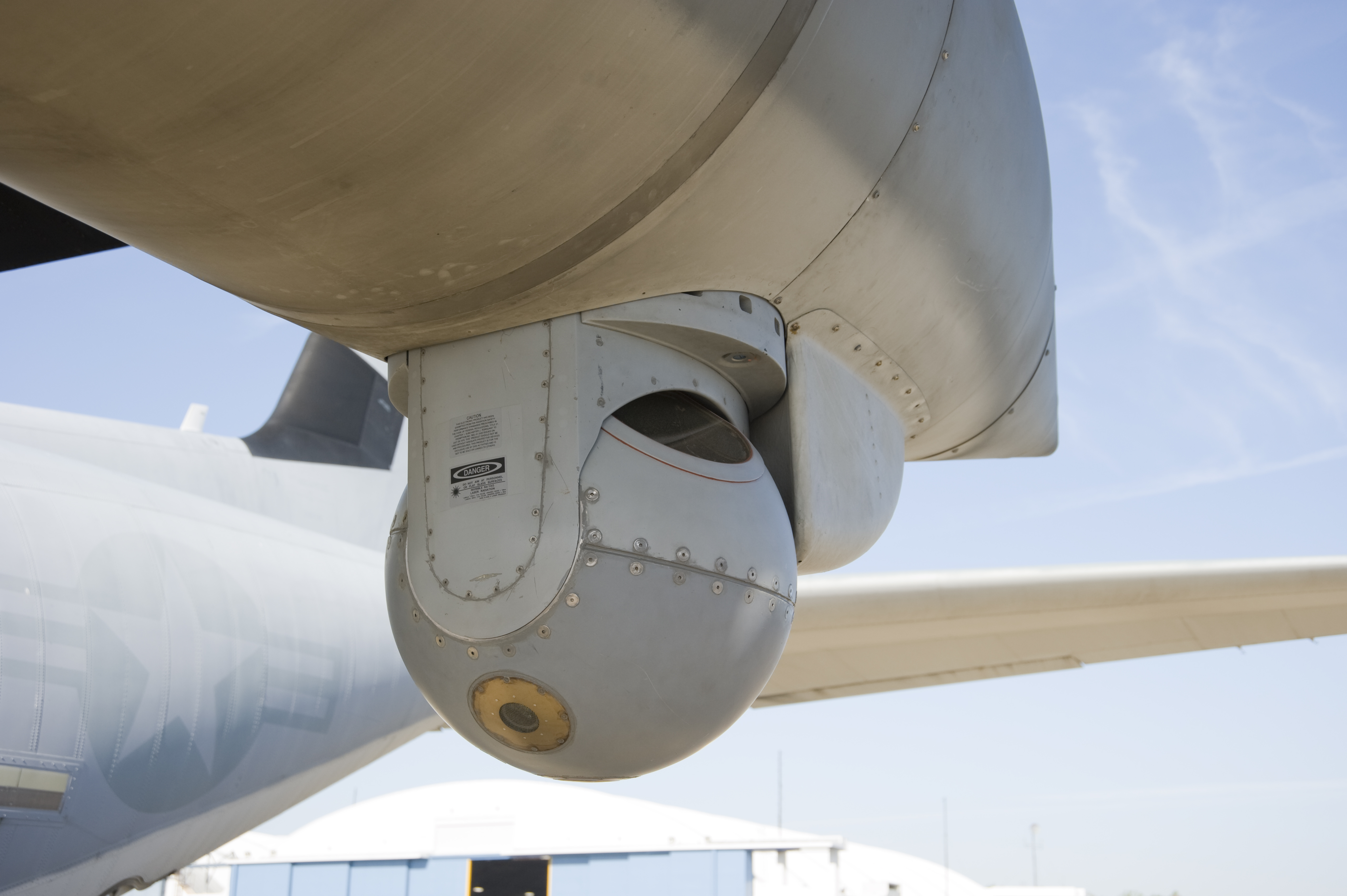
Target Sight System attached to the rear of a wing pylon fuel tank

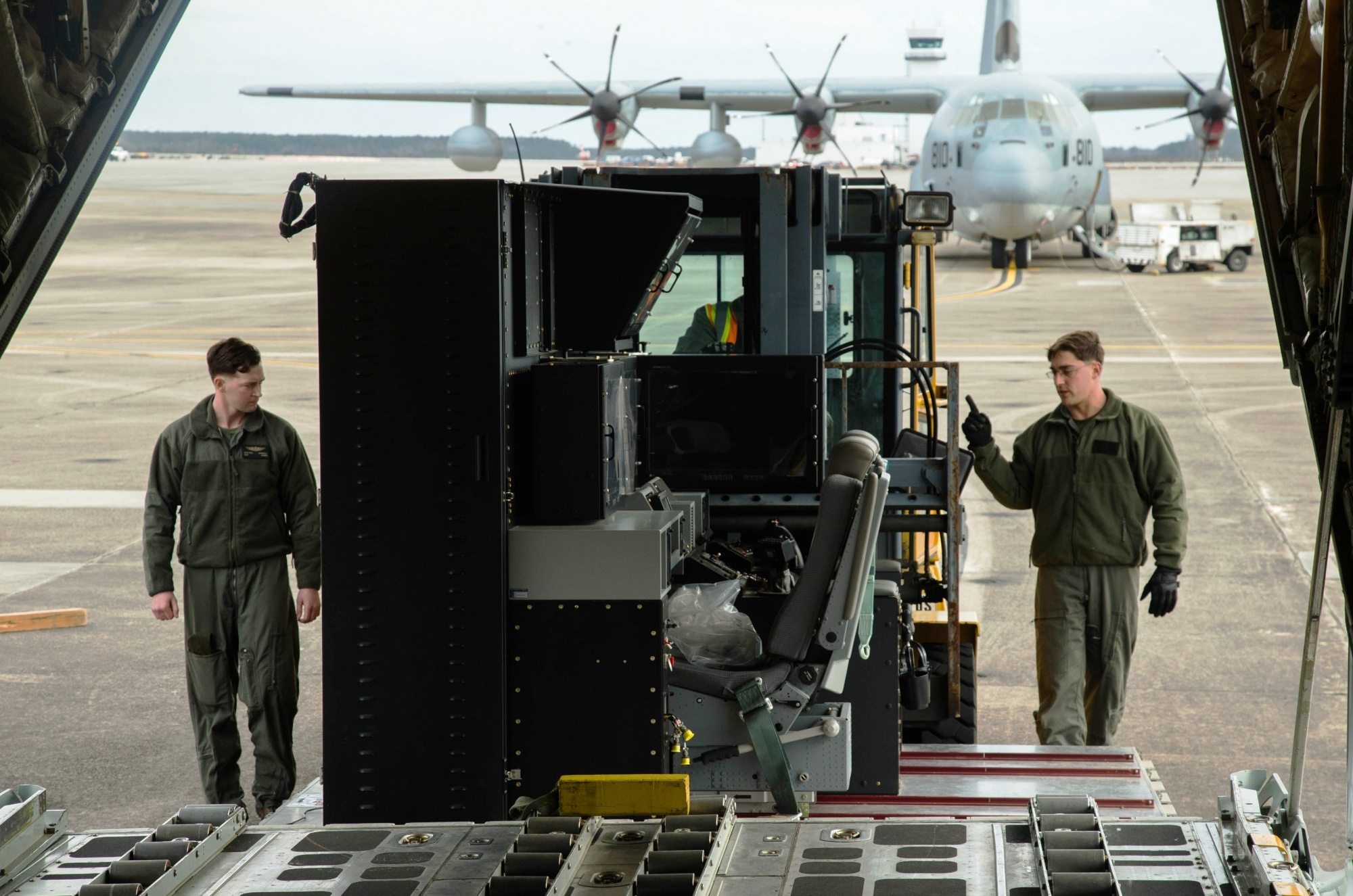
Acquisition and fire control pallet

Video of KC-130J Harvest HAWK live fire testing with early era equipment, 2013

== Operational history ==
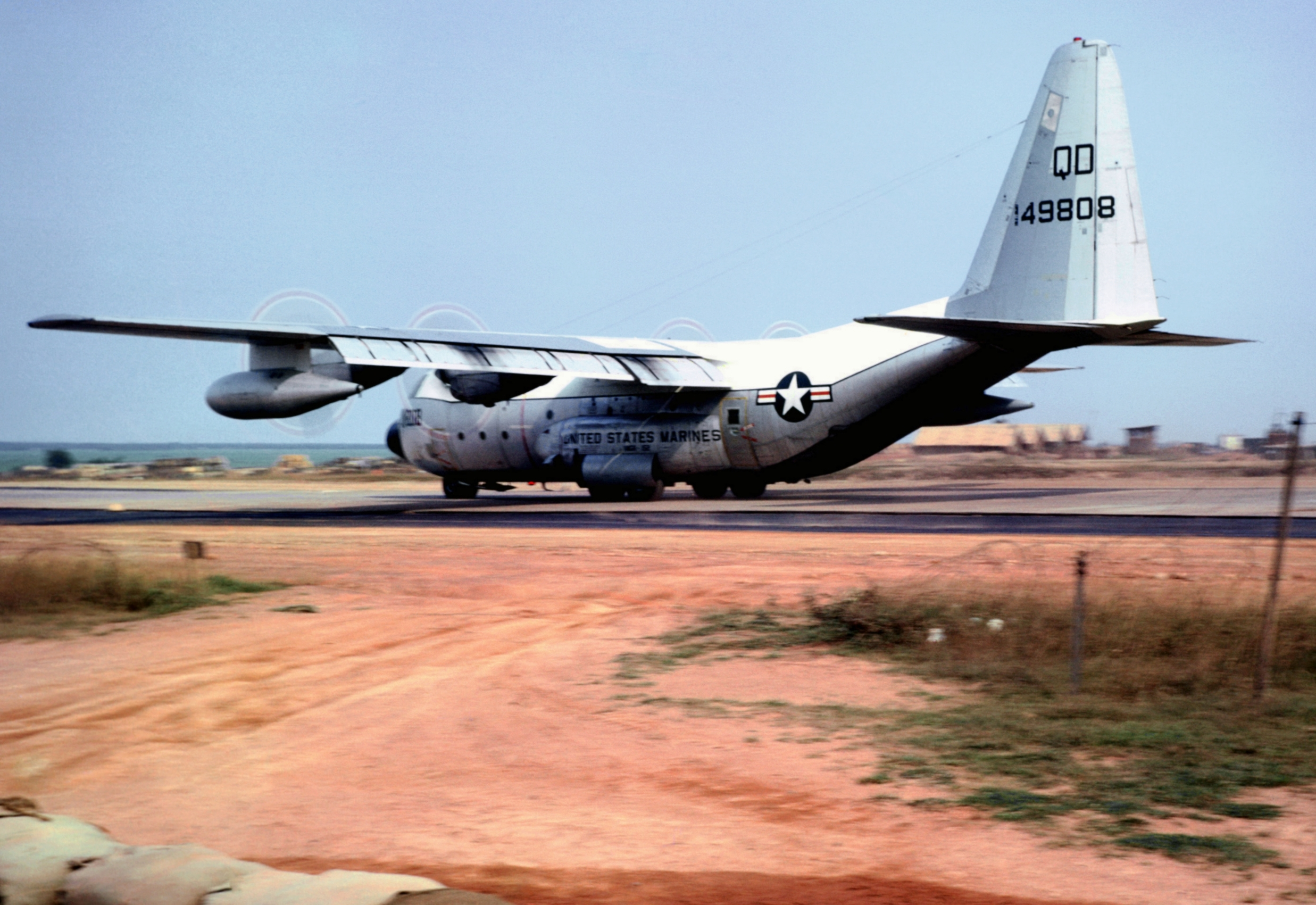
A VMGR-152 KC-130F landing at Dong Ha, Vietnam, in 1967.

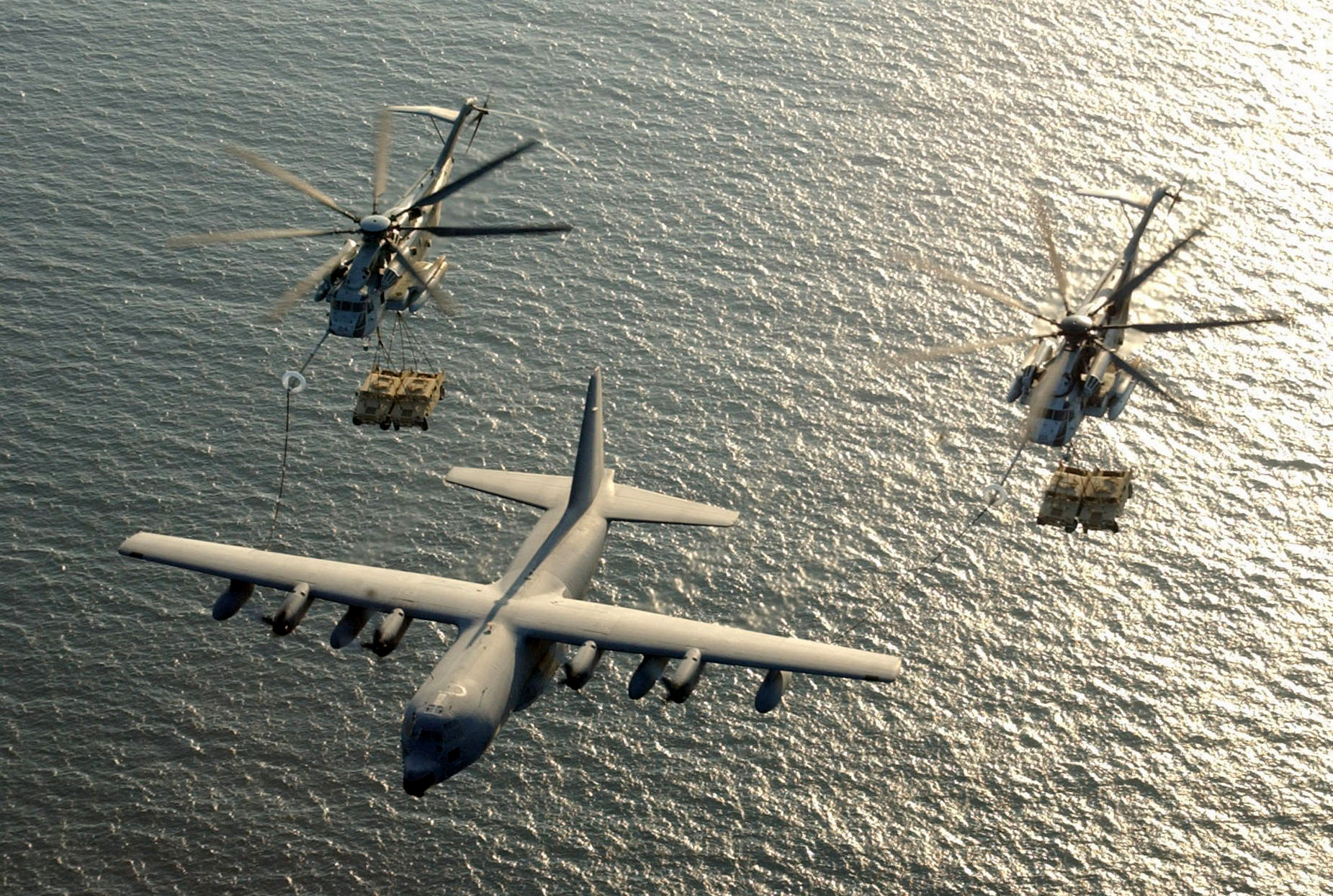
USMC KC-130 and CH-53Es over the Gulf of Aden, 2003

The KC-130 has supported operations in the Vietnam War, Operation Desert Shield, Operation Desert Storm, Operation Enduring Freedom, Operation Iraqi Freedom and other USMC operations over the last fifty years. It also participated in the Falklands War for Argentina.

VMGR-252, Cherry Point, NC, was the first fleet squadron to transition to the KC-130J. Contrary to most military squadrons when they transition to a new aircraft, VMGR-252 did not "stand down" to train and equip for the new airframe. Instead, they continued full-time fleet support with their "legacy" Hercs until fully converted to the J model. This trend was continued by squadrons as they transitioned to the KC-130J.

In February 2005, VMGR-252 made the first operational combat deployment of the KC-130J when six aircraft were deployed to Al Asad, Iraq in support of Operation Iraqi Freedom. During this time VMGR-252 experienced many "firsts" with the new J model conducting aerial refueling, delivery of cargo and passengers, the first combat aerial delivery of supplies by any J model user (the USAF subsequently conducted aerial delivery in Afghanistan with their new J models later that year) and battlefield illumination. VMGR-252 maintained the sole KC-130J presence for a year while VMGR-352 took delivery of and transitioned to the J model. The semi-permissive threat environment and the state of the art defensive systems of the J model permitted it to operate over the battlefield, providing fuel for the jets close to the fight, versus the tanker being far behind the lines in relative sanctuary. On more than one occasion VMGR-252 aircraft came under fire from insurgents, as did VMGR-352 aircraft during subsequent deployments to Iraq.

In 2006, VMGR-252 and 352 shared a joint detachment in Iraq and this paradigm continued for a number of years. In the summer of 2006, VMGR-252 provided a two KC-130J detachment in support of the 24th Marine Expeditionary Unit (24MEU) to RAF Akrotiri in Cyprus during the Lebanon/Israeli conflict that summer. Also during this time VMGR-252 began extensive operational training and tactics development with the new MV-22 Osprey, refining long range tanker procedures with the new tilt-rotor aircraft.

In Spring 2008, VMGR-252 again made KC-130J provided the KC-130J aircraft detachment to 24MEU as they reestablished the USMC presence in Kandahar, Afghanistan. This deployment experienced KC-130J successes conducting expeditionary type missions routinely landing at dirt runways, tactical aerial delivery of goods, and the traditional logistic support and refueling missions.

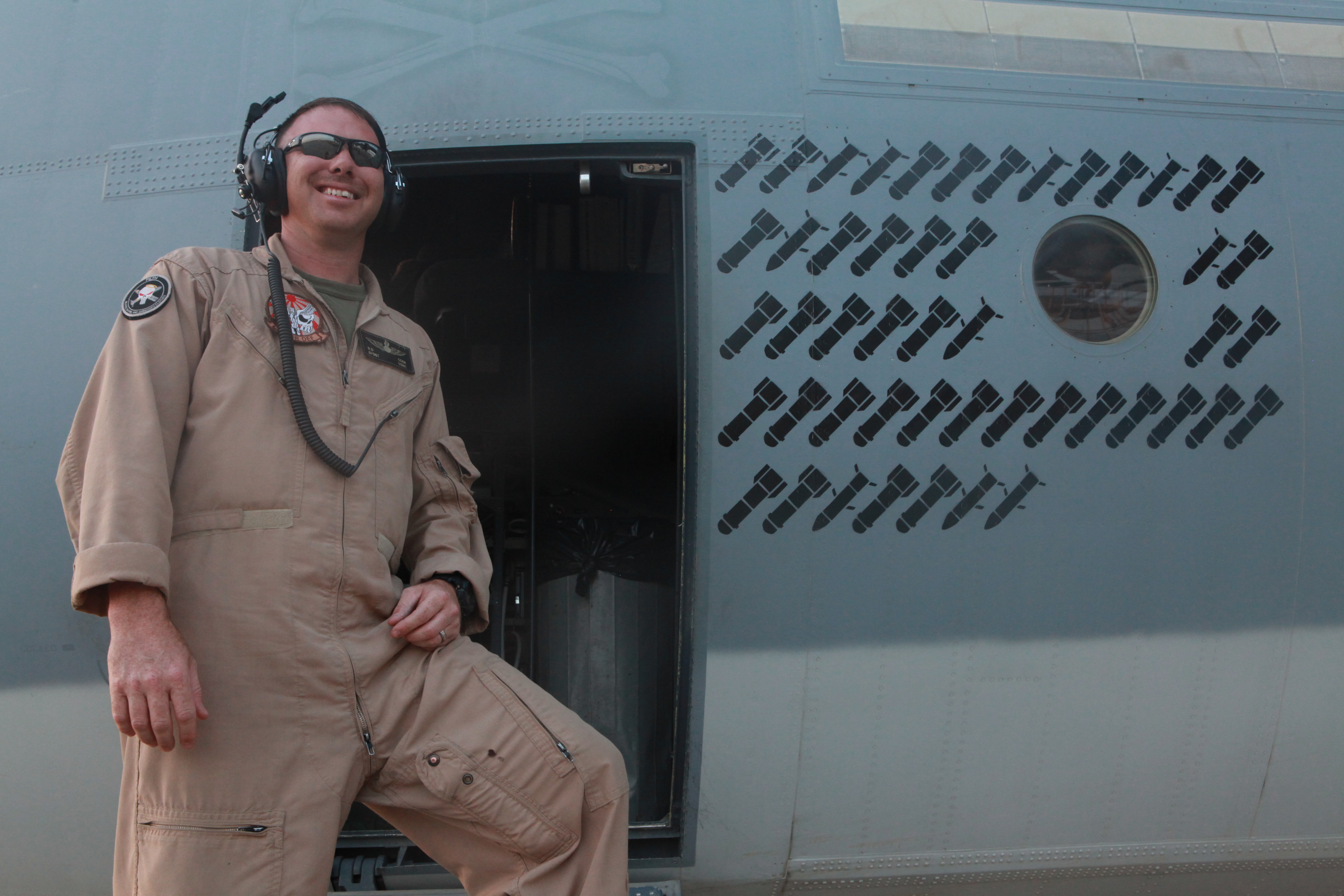
KC-130J Harvest Hawk weapon launch markings in Afghanistan, 2011.

Though the USMC KC-130Js have left Iraq, a continuing KC-130J presence has now been maintained in support of Operation Enduring Freedom in Afghanistan, with aircraft and crews provided by both VMGR-252 and 352 during different periods. In May 2009, the Okinawa-based "SUMOS" of VMGR-152 provided two aircraft and crews to support the OEF presence. This was VMGR-152's first operational combat deployment since Vietnam, and they have been maintaining a continuing presence in Afghanistan with VMGR-352/252.

USMC KC-130J aircraft from VMGR-252 and 352 have additionally been deployed to Djibouti for operations in the Horn of African supporting counter-terrorist operations in the region.

After the 2010 Pakistan floods, KC-130Js from USMC VMGR-352 squadron delivered over 90,000 kg (200,000 lbs) of cargo across Pakistan in support of flood relief efforts.

The Harvest Hawk weapons system for USMC KC-130J aircraft began its first deployment during October 2010 in Afghanistan with Marine Aerial Refueler Transport Squadron 352 (VMGR-352). Its first weapons engagement was on 4 November supporting the 3rd Battalion 5th Marines in Sangin. One Hellfire missile was fired and five enemy insurgents were killed. The battle damage assessment stated there were no civilian casualties or property damage during the fire fight.

A KC-130J from the 26th MEU participated in a pilot rescue during Operation Odyssey Dawn.

== Variants ==
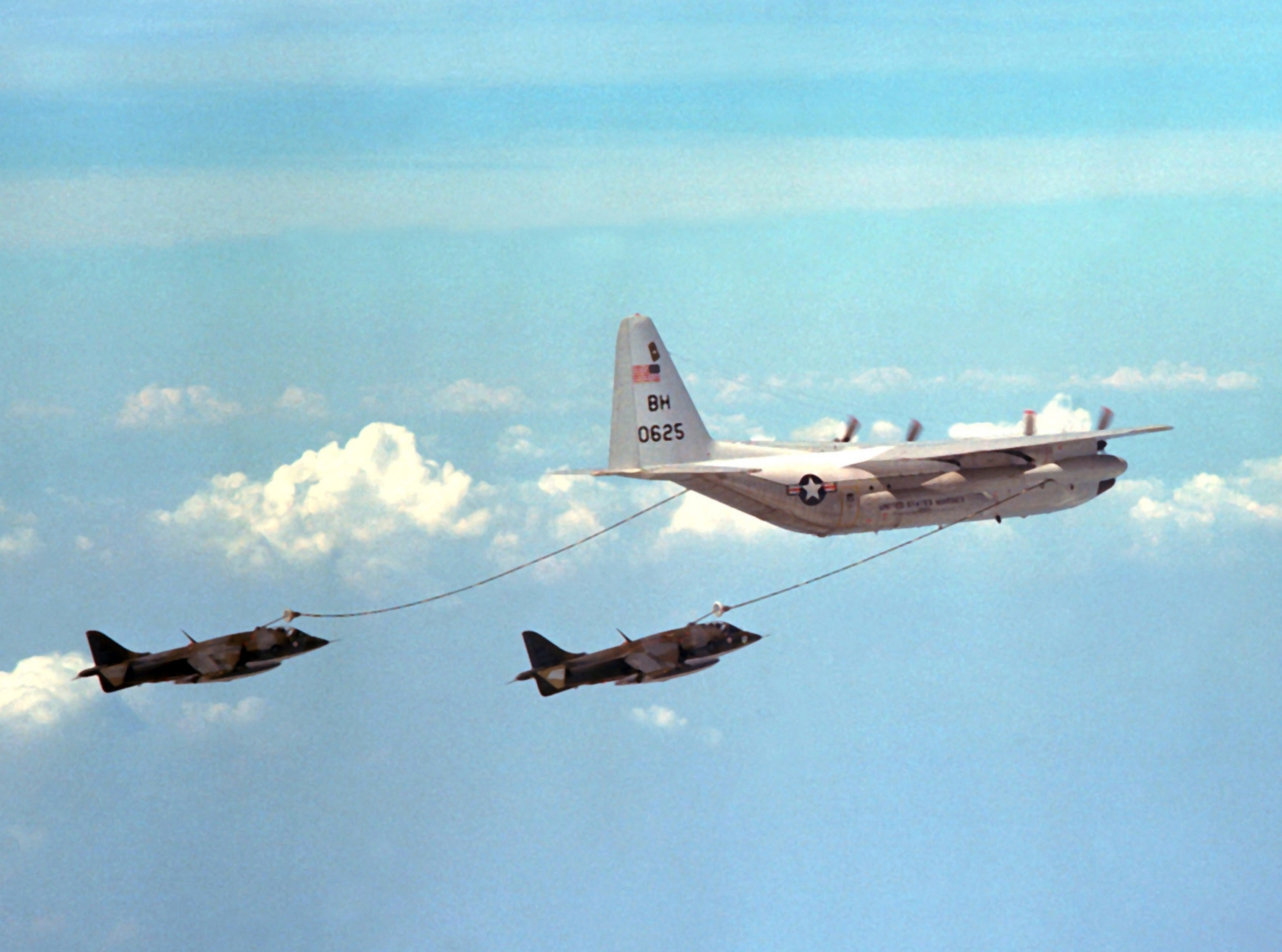
The VMGR-252 KC-130R, in this case BuNo 160625 (ex-AF Ser. No. 77-0321), was retired in 2008.

KC-130B
Six C-130B models were modified into in-flight refueling tankers. 4 currently operating with the Republic of Singapore Air Force (all four to be upgraded to KC-130H standard), 1 with Indonesian Air Force.
KC-130F
Enhanced KC-130B, 46 built
KC-130H
Tanker variant of C-130H, 33 built. In addition to these, JASDF has modified several (at least three) of its C-130Hs to have aerial refueling capability and uses them to support its UH-60J rescue helicopters.
KC-130R
14 former USAF aircraft transferred to the U.S. Marine Corps. Six had refueling gear removed and were sold to the Japan Maritime Self-Defense Force as C-130R aircraft to replace their remaining YS-11M/M-A aircraft for troop and cargo movement, humanitarian efforts, transport of senior leaders, and medical evacuation. Regeneration began in November 2012 and was to be completed by Fall 2013.
KC-130T
Variant from C-130H, 28 built
KC-130T-30
Variant from C-130H-30, 2 built, transferred to the U.S. Navy and converted to C-130T-30s.
KC-130J
Variant from C-130J

== Operators ==
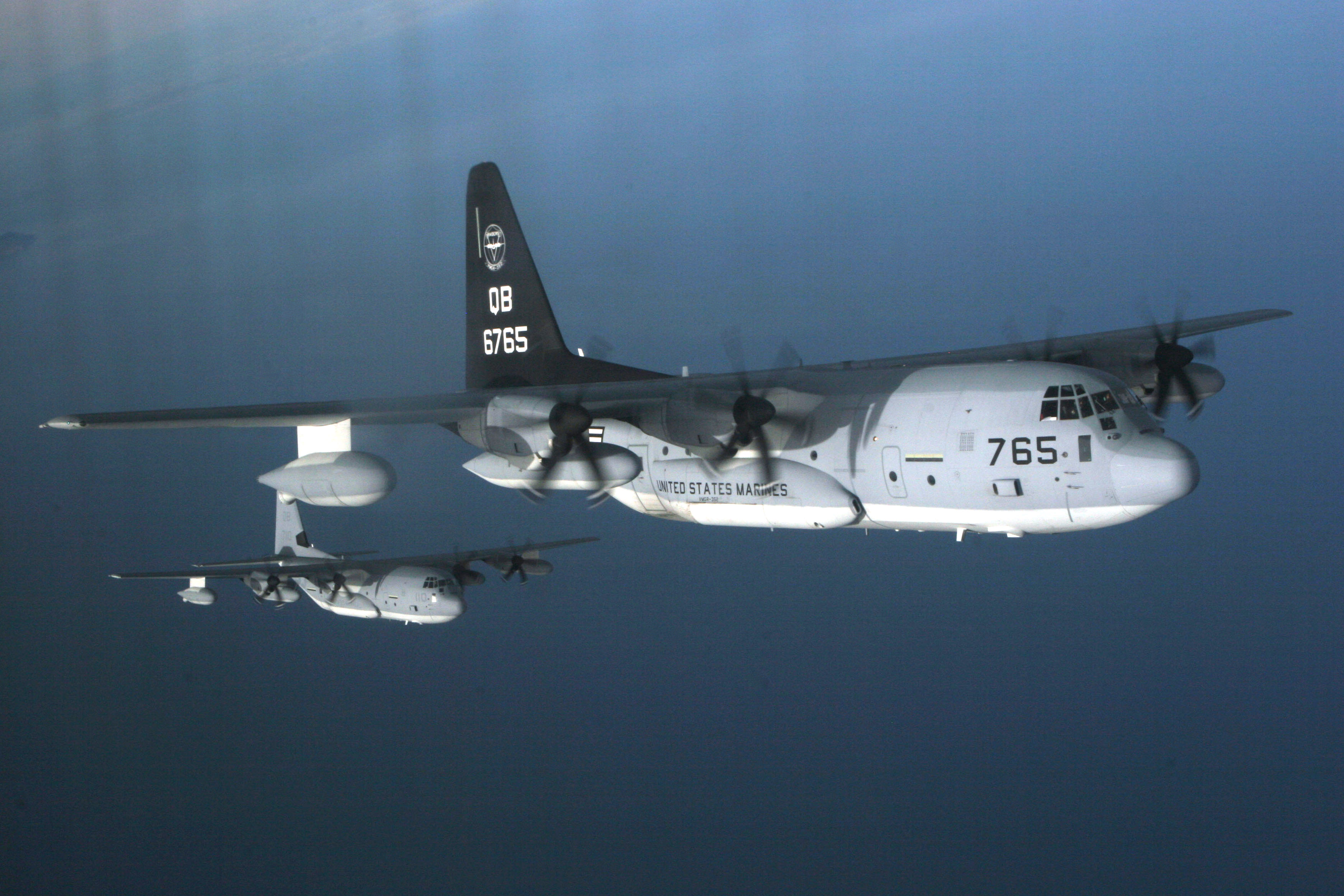
Two VMGR-352 KC-130Js during a training exercise, 2007

=== Current ===
Argentina

- Argentine Air Force
  - 1st Air Transport Squadron – El Palomar Air Base KC-130H

Brazil

- Brazilian Air Force
  - 1º/1ºGT (1º Esquadrão do 1º Grupo de Transporte) – Galeão Air Force Base, Two KC-130H

Chile

- Chilean Air Force
  - Grupo de Aviación N°10 (Santiago) four KC-130R delivered in 2016. Two in service as 2019.

Canada

- Royal Canadian Air Force
  - 435 Transport and Rescue Squadron operates 3 KC-130H as CC-130H(T)

France

- French Air Force
  - Two KC-130Js on order and delivery in 2016.

Germany

- German Air Force
  - Three KC-130Js operated in a joint Franco-German squadron based at Évreux-Fauville Air Base in France.

Indonesia

- Indonesian Air Force
  - 32nd Air Squadron – One KC-130B in service. One crashed in 2015.

Israel

- Israeli Air Force
  - 103 "Elephants" Squadron at Nevatim KC-130H
  - 131 "Yellow Bird" Squadron at Nevatim KC-130H

Italy

- Italian Air Force
  - 46 Brigata Aerea, 2 Gruppo – Pisa-San Giusto operates 7 C-130J converted to KC-130J, 1 lost to crash

Japan

- Japan Maritime Self Defense Force
  - Air Transport Squadron 61 (Fleet Air Force) operates six C-130R, converted from KC-130R
- Japan Air Self-Defense Force
  - 1st Tactical Airlift Group operates at least three KC-130H

Kuwait

- Kuwait Air Force 42 Transport Squadron

3 KC-130J in service, with an option to purchase three more

Libya

- Libyan Air Force

7 are on order

Malaysia

- Royal Malaysian Air Force 20 Squadron

4 KC-130T in service

Morocco

- Royal Moroccan Air Force Air Transport Squadron

Operates 2 KC-130H aircraft

Peru

- Peruvian Air Force

Operates two KC-130H aircraft acquired from Spain in 2020.

Saudi Arabia

- Royal Saudi Air Force
  - No. 32 Squadron RSAF based at Prince Sultan Airbase (KC-130H) : 5 KC-130J on order

Singapore

- Republic of Singapore Air Force 122 Squadron
  - 122 Squadron operates 4 KC-130B and 1 KC-130H. Upgraded by ST Aerospace with a new glass cockpit, avionics suite, and flight management system which makes the aircraft Global air-traffic management (GATM)-compliant. The KC-130Bs will also receive an auxiliary power unit and environmental control systems in common with C-130Hs.

Sweden

- Swedish Air Force

The Swedish air force operates 1 KC-130H tanker

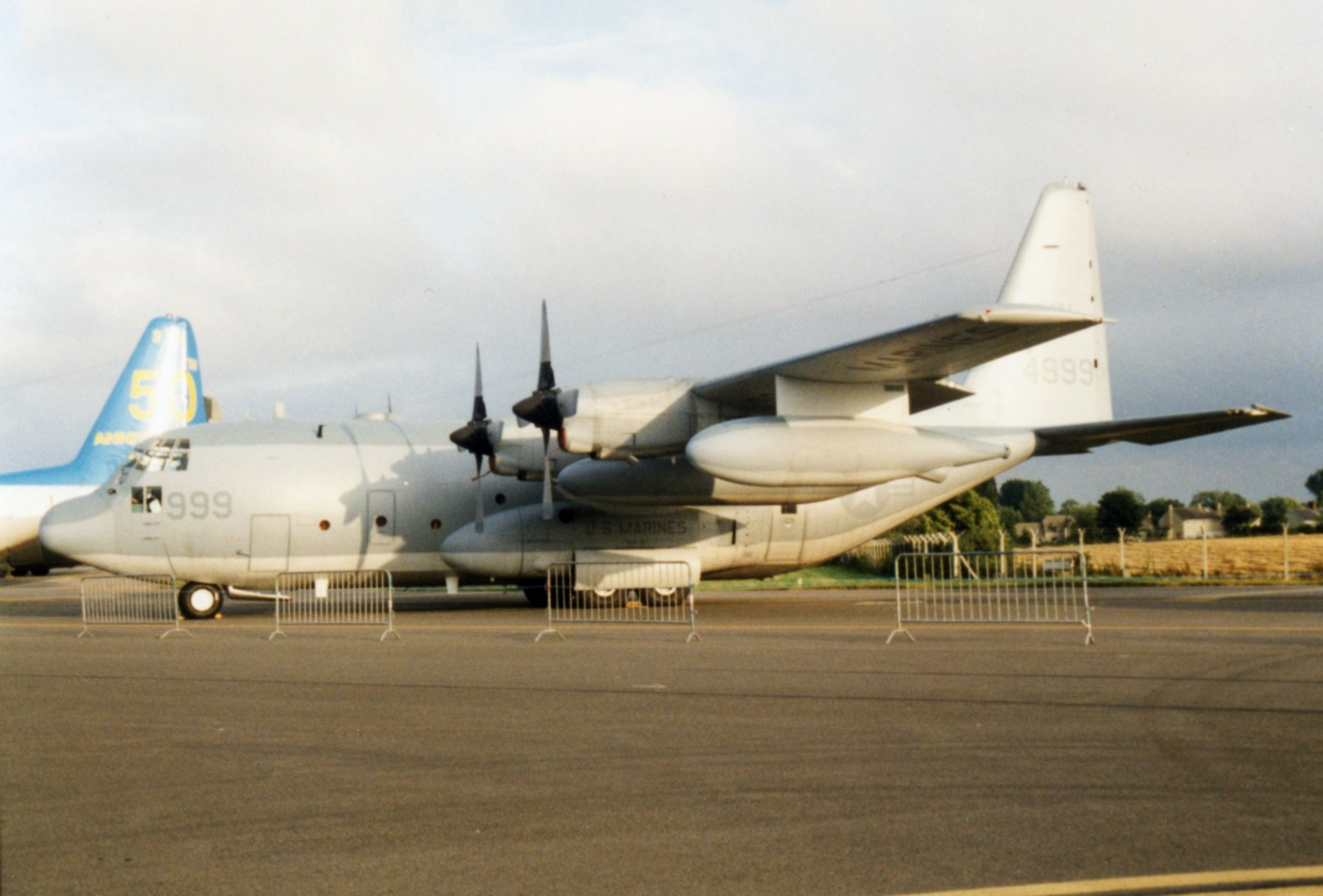
The KC-130T has officially been retired from the USMC Reserve on 5 May 2021, here VMGR-452.

United States

- United States Marine Corps
  - VMGR-152 operates 14 KC-130J
  - VMGR-153 (re-activated January 2023) operates 5 KC-130J
  - VMGR-252 operates 14 KC-130J
  - VMGR-352 operates 14 KC-130J
  - VMGR-234 operates 10 KC-130J (only reserve unit)
  - VMGR-452 decommissioned December 2022
  - VMGRT-253 decommissioned September 2006
- United States Navy
  - VX-20, a combined USN / USMC squadron, operates 1 KC-130J used for testing and evaluation, and 3 KC-130T for refueling USN and USMC aircraft conducting tests at NAS Patuxent River
  - VX-30 operates 2 KC-130T for refueling USN and USMC aircraft conducting tests on the NAVAIR Point Mugu Range; the KC-130s also conduct range clearing and safety surveillance
- United States Coast Guard
  - Coast Guard Air Station Elizabeth City operates 6 HC-130J

Uruguay

- Uruguayan Air Force
  - Operates two KC-130H aircraft acquired from Spain in 2020 to replace its two C-130B aircraft.

=== Former ===
Spain

- Spanish Air Force

== Accidents and incidents ==
On 10 July 2017, a Lockheed KC-130T known as "Yanky 72" crashed in Leflore County, Mississippi, killing all 16 people on board.

On 29 September 2020, a USMC Lockheed KC‑130J Hercules (BuNo 166765, call sign "Raider 50") from VMGR-352 "Raiders", based at MCAS Miramar, collided mid-air with an F‑35B Lightning II (call sign "Volt 93") during aerial refueling over Imperial County, California. The F‑35B pilot safely ejected before the jet crashed near Salton City. The KC‑130J lost both right-side engines and sustained significant structural damage. The crew diverted toward Thermal Airport but was unable to reach the runway and conducted a gear-up emergency landing in a nearby field. All eight Marines aboard survived uninjured. The aircrew received the Distinguished Flying Cross for their handling of the incident.

== Specifications (KC-130J) ==

Data from Lockheed Martin KC-130J Super Tanker fact sheet

General characteristics

- Crew: 4 (two pilots, one crew chief and one loadmaster are minimum crew)
- Capacity: 42,000 lb (19,051 kg)

- 92 passengers or
- 64 airborne troops or
- 6 pallets or
- 74 litter patients with 2 medical personnel
- 2–3 Humvees or an M113 armored personnel carrier
- Fuel offload capacity 57,000 lb (25,855 kg)

- Length: 97 ft 9 in (29.79 m)
- Wingspan: 132 ft 7 in (40.41 m)
- Height: 38 ft 10 in (11.84 m)
- Wing area: 1,745 sq ft (162.1 m^{2})
- Airfoil: root: NACA 64A318; tip: NACA 64A412
- Empty weight: 75,562 lb (34,274 kg)
- Gross weight: 164,000 lb (74,389 kg)
- Max takeoff weight: 175,000 lb (79,379 kg)
- Fuel capacity: 61,364 lb (27,834 kg) (with external tanks)
- Powerplant: 4 × Allison T56 and Rolls-Royce AE 2100D3 turboprop engines, 4,637 shp (3,458 kW) each
- Propellers: 6-bladed Dowty R391 constant-speed fully feathering reversible-pitch composite propellers

Performance

- Maximum speed: 362 kn (417 mph, 670 km/h)
- Cruise speed: 348 kn (400 mph, 644 km/h)
- Range: 2,835 nmi (3,262 mi, 5,250 km)
- Service ceiling: 28,000 ft (8,500 m) with 42,000 lb (19,051 kg) payload
- Take-off run: 3,127 ft (953 m) at 155,000 lb (70,307 kg)

== See also ==
Related development

- Lockheed AC-130
- Lockheed C-130 Hercules
- Lockheed DC-130
- Lockheed EC-130
- Lockheed HC-130
- Lockheed L-100 Hercules
- Lockheed LC-130
- Lockheed Martin C-130J Super Hercules
- Lockheed MC-130
- Lockheed WC-130

Aircraft of comparable role, configuration, and era

- Airbus A400M Atlas
- Antonov An-12
- Blackburn Beverley
- Shaanxi Y-8
- Short Belfast
- Transall C-160
- Embraer C-390 Millennium

Related lists

- List of tanker aircraft
- List of United States military aerial refueling aircraft
- List of accidents and incidents involving the Lockheed C-130 Hercules
- List of active Canadian military aircraft
- List of active United Kingdom military aircraft
- List of active United States military aircraft
- List of aircraft of the Israeli Air Force
- List of aircraft of the Royal Air Force
- List of Lockheed aircraft
- List of United States Navy aircraft designations (pre-1962)
