= VX-20 =

Air Test and Evaluation Squadron 20
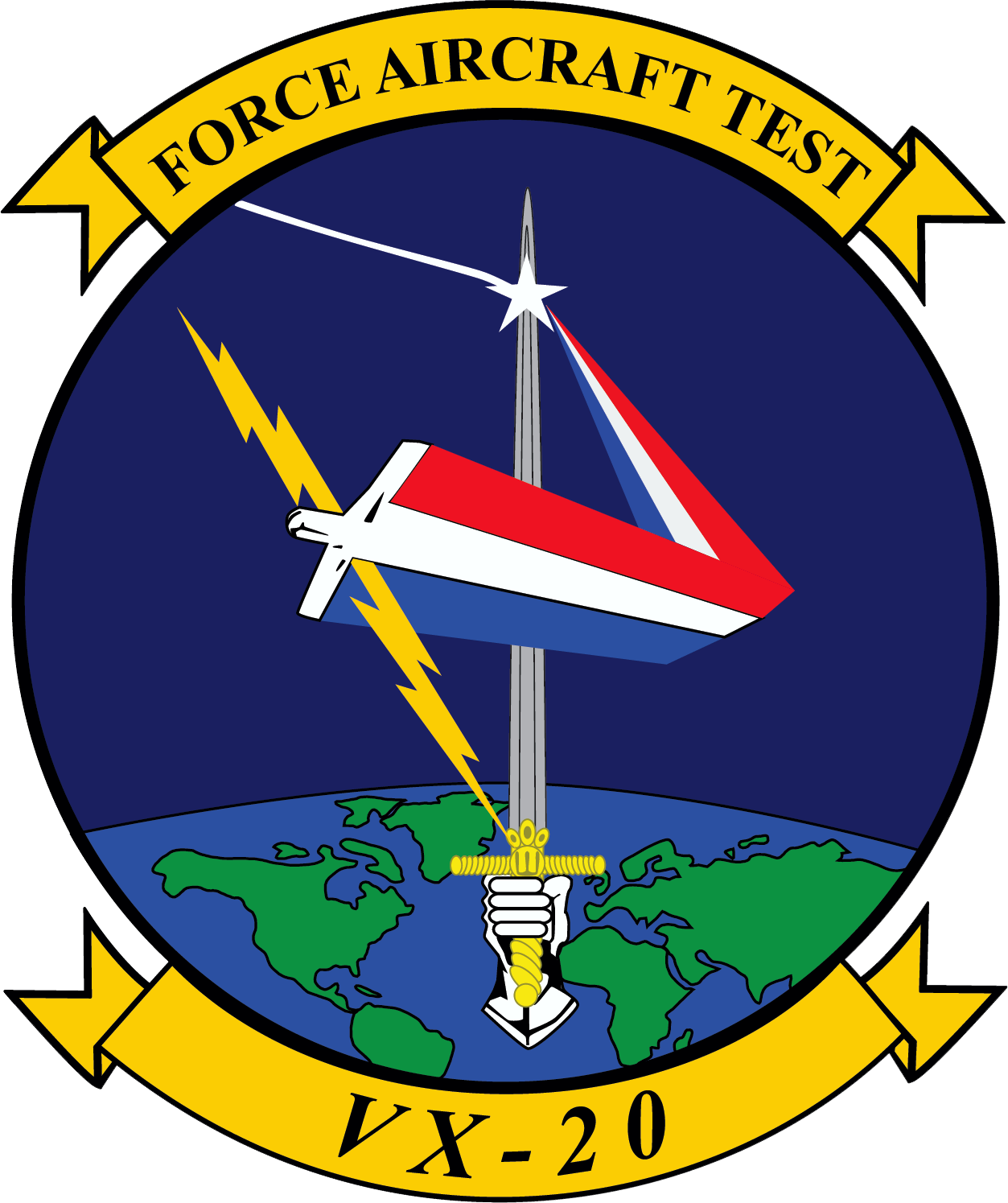
- VX-20 Insignia
- Active: 1975–present
- Country: United States
- Branch: United States Navy
- Type: special flight test aircraft squadron
- Garrison/HQ: NAS Patuxent River
- Nickname: Force

Commanders
- Current commander: CDR Charles Larwood III, USN

VX-20, Air Test and Evaluation Squadron Twenty, (AIRTEVRON TWO ZERO) is a United States Navy air test and evaluation squadron based at Naval Air Station Patuxent River, Maryland.

== Operations ==
VX-20 operates a variety of Naval aircraft for testing and evaluation of new technologies, including variants of the Northrop Grumman E-2 Hawkeye, Boeing E-6 Mercury, Northrop Grumman MQ-4C Triton, Lockheed C-130 Hercules, and C-12 Huron. VX-20's Lockheed Martin KC-130J Super Hercules tanker was used for flight tests of the Harvest HAWK weapon systems used to arm the tanker aircraft. Since 2010, VX-20 has been operating flight test models of the Boeing P-8A Poseidon maritime patrol and reconnaissance aircraft.

== Mission statement ==
The official VX-20 mission statement reads, "We provide trained people, test ready aircraft, and access to state of the art facilities necessary for the development of cutting edge technology to support the War fighting needs of the operating forces."

== History ==
Air Test and Evaluation Squadron Twenty can trace its roots all the way to the founding of the Naval Air Station Patuxent River, Maryland. Recognizing the need for consolidation of the Navy's flight test efforts, NAS Patuxent River was established on 1 April 1943, due to its proximity to the coast, freedom from air traffic congestion, and isolation for testing of classified projects. On 16 June 1945, the Navy officially designated the Naval Air Test Center.

In April, 1975, after 30 years of operations at Patuxent River, the Flight Test Division, Weapons Test Division, Service Test Division, and U.S. Naval Test Pilot School reorganized under the Naval Air Test Center into the Antisubmarine Aircraft Test Directorate, Strike Aircraft Test Directorate, Rotary Aircraft Test Directorate, and Naval Test Pilot School.

Under the command of Officer-in-Charge Captain John A. Dunaway, Antisubmarine Aircraft Test Directorate was tasked to support the fleet through the flight test and evaluation of aircraft systems for the VP, VS, VAW, VRC, VQ (TACAMO), VQ (ELINT/SIGINT), VR, and VT squadrons.

In order to more closely identify itself with the communities to which it was responsible, the directorate was renamed Force Warfare Aircraft Test Directorate in June 1986. In May 1995, the organization officially became a squadron and was renamed Naval Force Aircraft Test Squadron under the command of Captain Stuart A. Ashton.

As of December 1998 the squadron was responsible for testing and evaluating aircraft and systems used for various Navy missions, including anti-submarine warfare under command of Capt. John B. Hollyer (former test pilot of the squadron). It operates and maintains 11 types of aircraft, including the P-3 Orion, the C-130 Hercules, the E-2 Hawkeye, the S-3 Viking and the E-6 Mercury.

In December 2000 Capt. J. B. Hollyer turned over command of the Force Aircraft Test Squadron to Cmdr. Steve R. Eastburg. In order to more closely align itself with the squadrons it serves, in May 2002, under the command of Capt. S. R. Eastburg, the squadron was redesignated Air Test and Evaluation Squadron Twenty. Now a combined USN / USMC organization, the squadron has also assumed responsibility for test and evaluation of Marine Corps VMGR aircraft and follow-on Navy VP and VR aircraft.

The squadron is currently under the command of CDR Jessica Barrientos.

== See also ==
- History of the United States Navy
- List of United States Navy aircraft squadrons
- VX-23
