= VMGR-452 =

Marine Aerial Refueler Transport Squadron 452
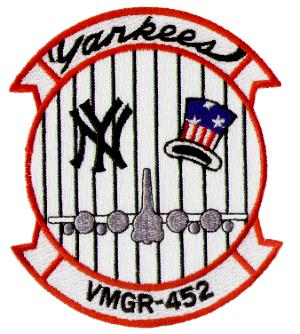
- VMGR-452 Insignia
- Active: 9 September 1988 – 2 December 2022
- Country: United States
- Branch: United States Marine Corps
- Type: Cargo Transport / Aerial refueling
- Role: Assault support
- Part of: Marine Aircraft Group 49; 4th Marine Aircraft Wing
- Garrison/HQ: Stewart Air National Guard Base, New York
- Nickname: "Yankees"
- Tail Code: NY
- Engagements: Operation Desert Storm; Operation Enduring Freedom; Operation Iraqi Freedom; 2003 invasion of Iraq

Marine Aerial Refueler Transport Squadron 452 (VMGR-452) was a reserve United States Marine Corps cargo squadron that previously flew the Lockheed Martin KC-130J. The squadron fell under the command of Marine Aircraft Group 49 (MAG-49) and the 4th Marine Aircraft Wing (4th MAW). The squadron, known as the "Yankees", was stationed at Stewart Air National Guard Base, New York.

== Mission ==
Support Fleet Marine Force commitments worldwide by providing both fixed-wing and rotary-wing aerial refueling capabilities in addition to assault air transport of personnel, equipment, and supplies.

== History ==
=== Gulf War ===
Detachments of VMGR-452 deployed alongside VMGR-234 to support the staging of Marine units in Operation Desert Shield and Operation Desert Storm.

=== Global War on Terror ===
Following the September 11, 2001 attacks, 62 reservists were activated in order to support Operation Enduring Freedom on 28 January 2002. The activated reservists along with numerous active duty Marines from MAG-49 Detachment B were consolidated to create a Detachment A (Det A). This detachment would be part of the 2nd Marine Aircraft Wing and would be accompanied by four VMGR-452 aircraft. They supported operations in the Mediterranean, Horn of Africa, and the Middle East. The primary mission was to support the 22nd, 24th, and 26th Marine Expeditionary Units.

On 14 January 2003, the squadron was once again called up to support Operation Iraqi Freedom. The remainder of the reserves were activated for this operation. Seven aircraft along with pilots, aircrew, and support Marines went to Bahrain to join two other KC130 squadrons. These squadrons were VMGR-234 and VMGR-352. The three squadrons would join to create the Hercules Air Group (HAG). While being a part of the HAG, VMGR-452 supported Operation Southern Watch by doing aerial refueling for aircraft patrolling the southern no-fly zone. Once Operation Iraqi Freedom commenced, the squadron transported over 3 million pounds of cargo, distributed over 3.5 million pounds of fuel in aerial refueling, over 1 million pounds of fuel for Rapid Ground Refuelers (RGRs), transported over 3,000 pax, and flew 632 sorties consisting of 1371.0 hrs. VMGR-452 also contributed in medical evacuations, and helped transport the seven prisoners-of-war out of harm's way.

On 2 December 2022, the squadron was deactivated in support of Force Design 2030.

=== 2017 Crash ===
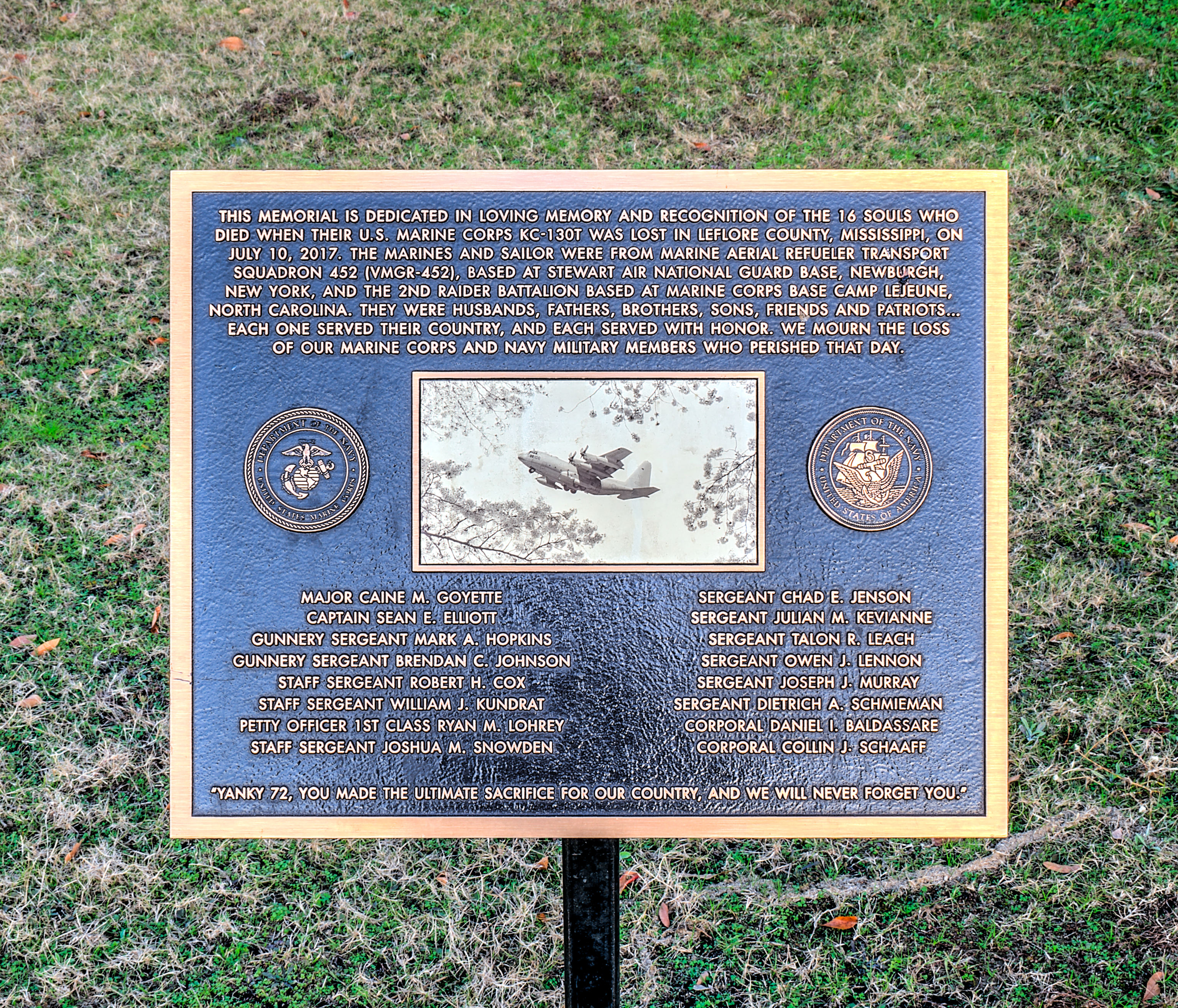
Memorial at the Museum of Aviation

On 10 July 2017, one of VMGR-452's KC-130T aircraft took off from Marine Corps Air Station Cherry Point, North Carolina, and crashed later that afternoon in Mississippi, killing all 16 personnel onboard.

== See also ==
- United States Marine Corps Aviation
- List of active United States Marine Corps aircraft squadrons
- List of inactive United States Marine Corps aircraft squadrons
