= VMGRT-253 =

Marine Aerial Refueler Transport Training Squadron 253
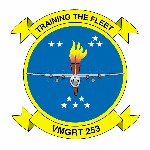
- VMGRT-253 unit insignia
- Active: 1 October 1986 – 14 September 2006
- Country: United States
- Branch: USMC
- Role: Fleet Replacement Squadron
- Part of: Marine Aircraft Group 14; 2nd Marine Aircraft Wing
- Garrison/HQ: Marine Corps Air Station Cherry Point
- Nickname(s): Titans
- Motto(s): "We will never quit" "Training the Fleet"
- Tail Code: GR

Commanders
- Current commander: (Unit Deactivated)

Marine Aerial Refueler Transport Training Squadron 253 (VMGRT 253) was based at Marine Corps Air Station Cherry Point, North Carolina, and responsible for providing the Fleet Marine Force active-duty and reserve KC-130 squadrons with qualified replacement pilots and enlisted aircrew. Known as the "Titans", VMGRT-253 was a subordinate unit of Marine Aircraft Group 14, 2nd Marine Aircraft Wing.

== Mission ==
Tasked with the initial training of all KC-130 pilots, Tactical System Operators (Navigators), Flight Engineers, Loadmasters, and First Mechanics. The squadron delivers combat capable crews to the fleet KC-130 squadrons, thus allowing the fleet squadrons to concentrate on tactical awareness and preparation. Refresher training is also provided for Marine aviators returning to flying duty after extended ground assignments. The squadron employs 5 KC-130F aircraft, in order to complete its mission of training 30 Aviators, 24 Tactical System Operators, 8 Flight Engineers, 22 Loadmasters, and 30 Flight Mechanics each year.

As the model manager for the Marine Corps' KC-130 community, VMGRT-253 is charged with maintaining standardization throughout the fleet. Until 1989, VMGRT-253 was also the Fleet Replacement Enlisted Skills Training Center (FREST), tasked with training all the KC-130 maintenance crew Marines and Sailors. As the Model Manager for maintenance training, VMGRT-253 consolidated East and West Coast technical schools into a new 43,000-square-foot (4,000 m^{2}) facility.

== History ==
The squadron was activated on 1 October 1986 as Marine Aerial Refueler Transport Training Squadron 253 (VMGRT-253). They received their first C-130 Hercules aircraft, bureau number 149803 on 20 November 1986. The squadron held its official commissioning ceremony on 30 January 1987.

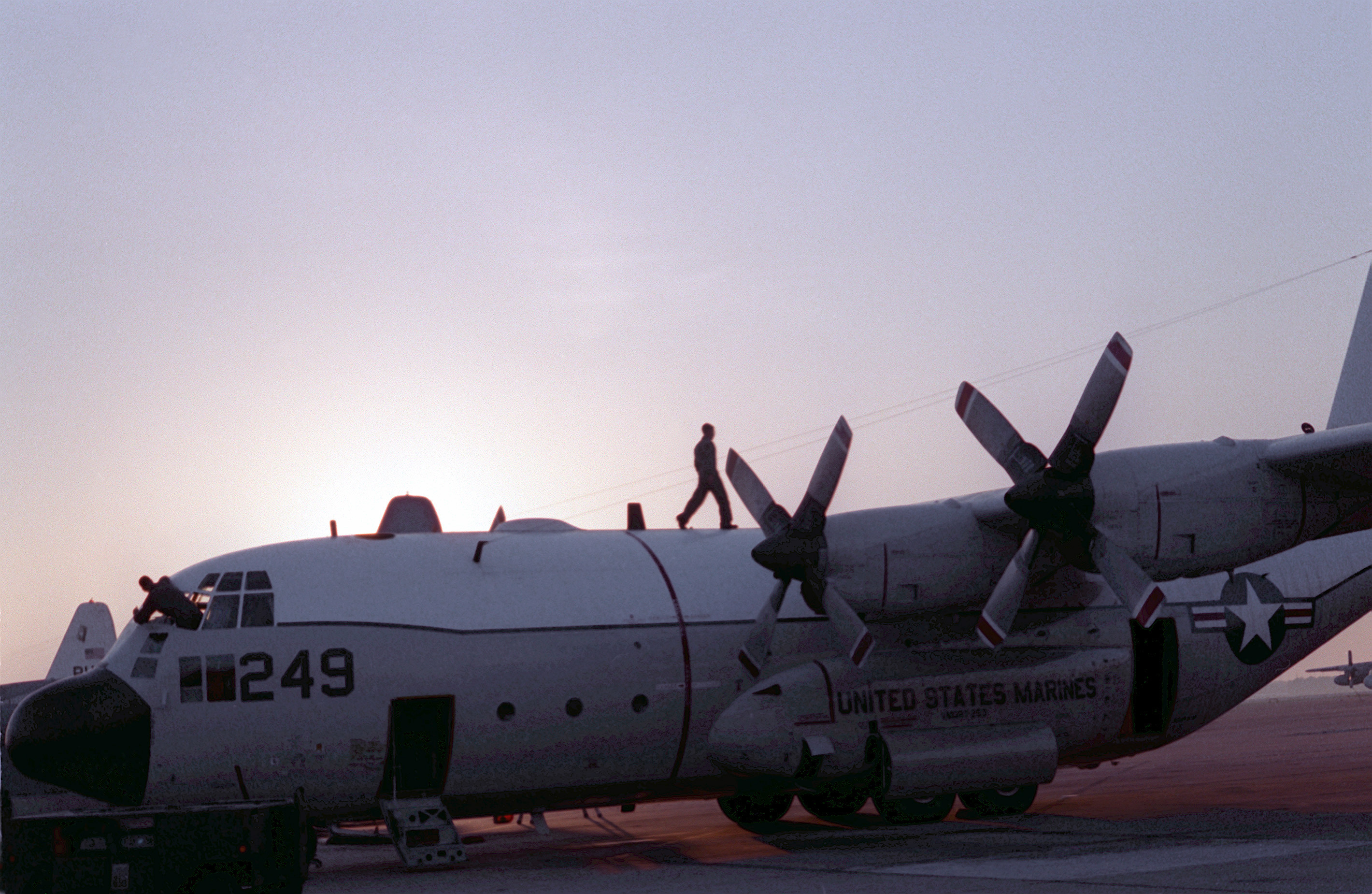
An KC-130F of VMGRT-253 at MCAS Cherry Point, 1989.

In addition to improving the aircrew and maintenance personnel of 10 Navy and Marine Corps squadrons, VMGRT-253 stands ready to augment forward deployed operational units. During Operation Desert Storm VMGRT-253 was tasked with providing tankers to requalify numerous fixed wing jet pilots in aerial refueling prior to deploying to the desert. Additionally, after Hurricane Hugo in 1989 and Hurricane Andrew in 1992, VMGRT-253 crews and aircraft provided disaster relief support. In March 1996 the Titans completed their first ever full deployment. While deployed in Key West for two weeks the squadron carried out all normal assignments and flew an aggressive flight schedule.

In 2000, VMGRT-253 broke new ground when it became the first Marine Corps squadron to receive the KC-130J. The J-Flight Introduction Team (JFIT) was formed and the squadron was tasked with building a training program and training the aircrews. 20 December 2002, VMGRT-253 transferred its KC-130J’s and personnel to VMGR-252. In 2005, VMGRT-253 flew 67 sorties and 137.2 hours, carrying 405,911 lb (184,118 kg) of cargo and 236 passengers in support of Hurricane Katrina relief efforts. The squadron also aided the evacuation efforts of aircraft and personnel aboard MCAS Cherry Point during Hurricane Ophelia to Wright-Patterson AFB.

The squadron was officially deactivated during a ceremony on 14 September 2006. LtCol Adam Holmes (the last commander of the unit) cased the unit colors, which were placed in storage.

== Safety ==
With the most diverse training requirements in the Marine Corps, the squadron has achieved impressive milestones. Since its commissioning, VMGRT-253 has flown over 19 years without a class "A" mishap while teaching the least experienced aircrew, making over 5000 landings a year and achieving 55,000 total flight hours in the oldest aircraft in the Fleet. The Titans have received awards for both safety and community service. VMGRT-253 has received 8 consecutive Fleet Marine Force Aviation Safety Awards and 2 Commandant’s Unit Awards for mishap free flight time.

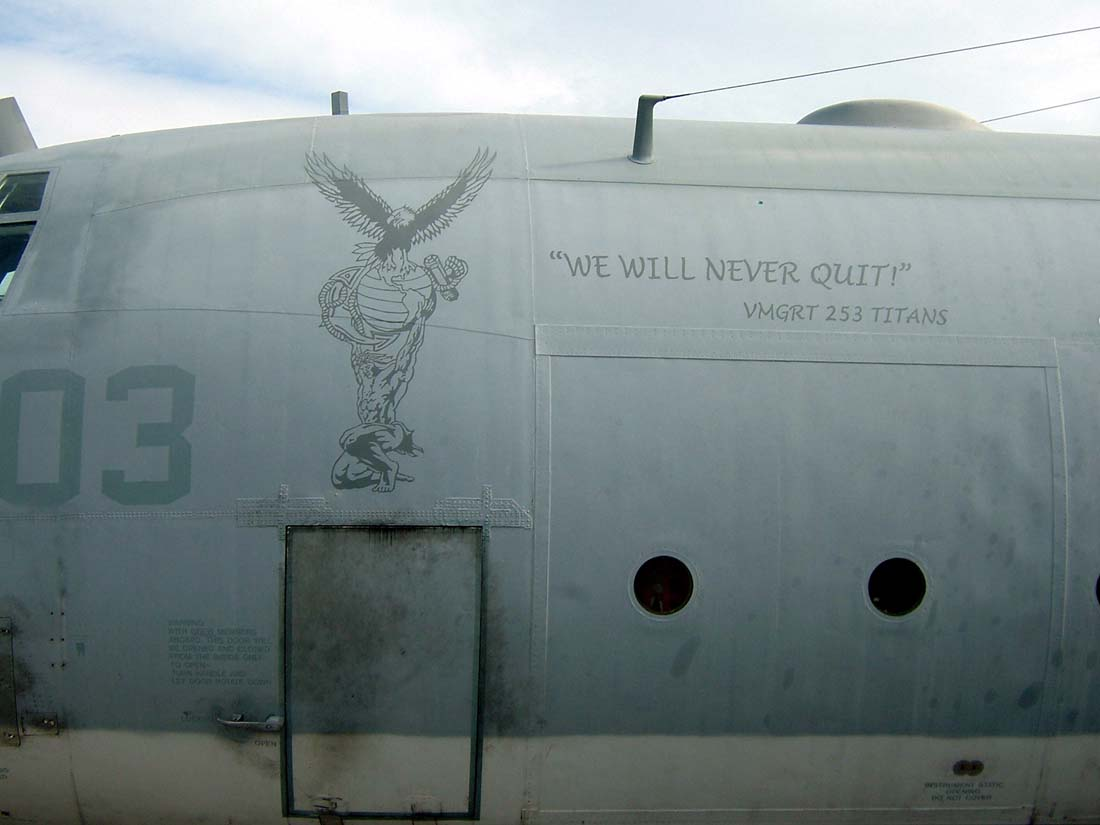
Photo of the squadron's logo

== See also ==
- List of decommissioned United States Marine Corps aircraft squadrons
- United States Marine Corps Aviation
