= VMGR-252 =

Marine Aerial Refueler Transport Squadron 252
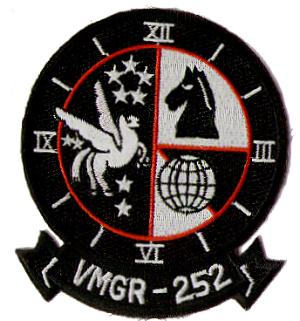
- VMGR-252 Insignia
- Active: 1 June 1928 - present
- Country: United States
- Allegiance: United States of America
- Branch: United States Marine Corps
- Type: Cargo Transport / Aerial refueling
- Role: Assault support
- Size: 420 Marines
- Part of: Marine Aircraft Group 14; 2nd Marine Aircraft Wing
- Garrison/HQ: Marine Corps Air Station Cherry Point
- Nickname(s): Otis
- Motto(s): "Otis, my man!"
- Tail Code: BH
- Engagements: World War II * Battle of Iwo Jima * Battle of Okinawa; Vietnam War; Operation Desert Storm; Operation Enduring Freedom; Operation Iraqi Freedom

Commanders
- Current commander: Lieutenant Colonel Brian A. Kursawe

Aircraft flown
- Transport: R4D Skytrain; R4Q Flying Boxcar; KC-130F/R Hercules; KC-130J Super Hercules

Marine Aerial Refueler Transport Squadron 252 (VMGR-252) is a United States Marine Corps KC-130J squadron. They are a part of Marine Aircraft Group 14 (MAG-14), 2nd Marine Aircraft Wing (2nd MAW) and provide both fixed-wing and rotary-wing aerial refueling capabilities to support Fleet Marine Force air operations in addition to assault air transport of personnel, equipment, and supplies. The squadron, known as "Otis" is stationed at Marine Corps Air Station Cherry Point, North Carolina. It also has the distinction of being the oldest continually active squadron in the Marine Corps.

== Mission ==
Support the MAGTF Commander by providing air-to-air refueling, assault support, Close Air Support (CAS) and Multi-sensor Imagery Reconnaissance (MIR), day or night under all weather conditions during expeditionary, joint, or combined operations.

== History ==
=== Early years ===
The squadron was formed 1 June 1928, and designated Headquarters Detachment 7M in San Diego, California. The squadron was re-designated several times in the next decade. It received the designation Marine Utility Squadron 252 (VMJ-252) on 1 July 1941, and Marine Transport Squadron 252 (VMR-252) on 1 April 1945.

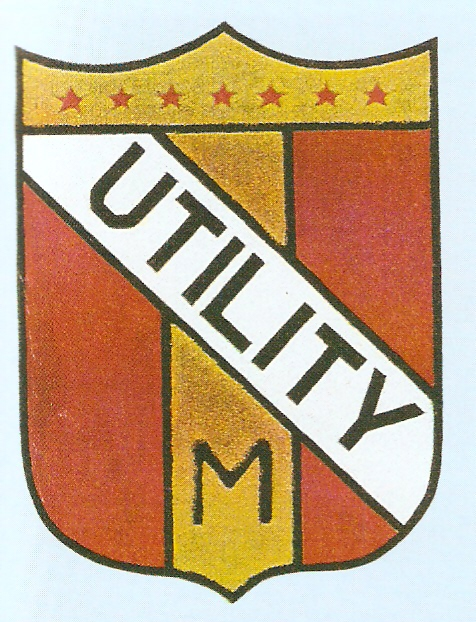
Squadron logo when they were VJ-7M

=== World War II ===
The squadron was heavily involved during World War II and participated in the following campaigns: Pearl Harbor, Marianas, Iwo Jima, and Okinawa. Following the war, the squadron relocated to MCAS Cherry Point and was reassigned to Marine Aircraft Group 21.

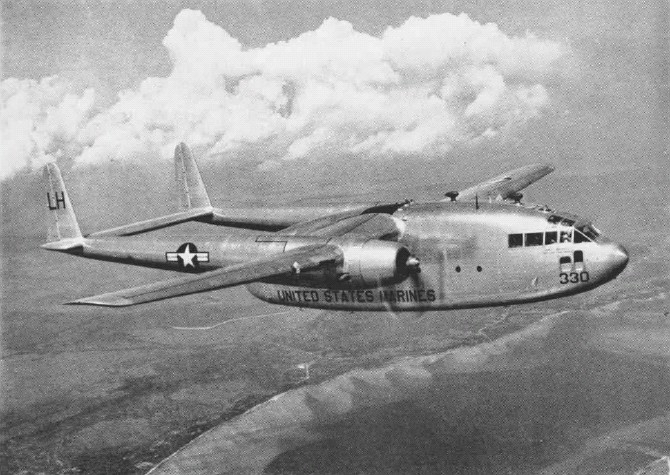
A VMR-252 R4Q-1 in 1950

=== Post World War II through the 1980s ===
In July 1946, VMR-252 was based at MCAS Miramar as part of Marine Aircraft Group 25. They remained there until 14 October 1946 when they were moved to MCAS El Toro. During October 1961, the KC-130 Hercules became the squadron's aircraft. With the introduction of the KC-130, the squadron's primary mission was changed to aerial refueling. On 1 February 1962, the Squadron received its present designation as Marine Aerial Refueler Transport Squadron 252 (VMGR-252). In December 1965, the KC-130 was used to refuel the CH-3 helicopter. This was the first time that a tanker drogue system was used to refuel a helicopter.

The late sixties and early seventies found VMGR-252 actively supporting U.S. Forces in the Republic of Vietnam, transporting essential equipment, parts, and personnel. VMGR-252 also supported the introduction of the AV-8A Harrier. In August 1973, VMGR-252 was involved in the development of safe and standardized aerial refueling procedures to be used with the Harrier.

=== The Gulf War and the 1990s ===
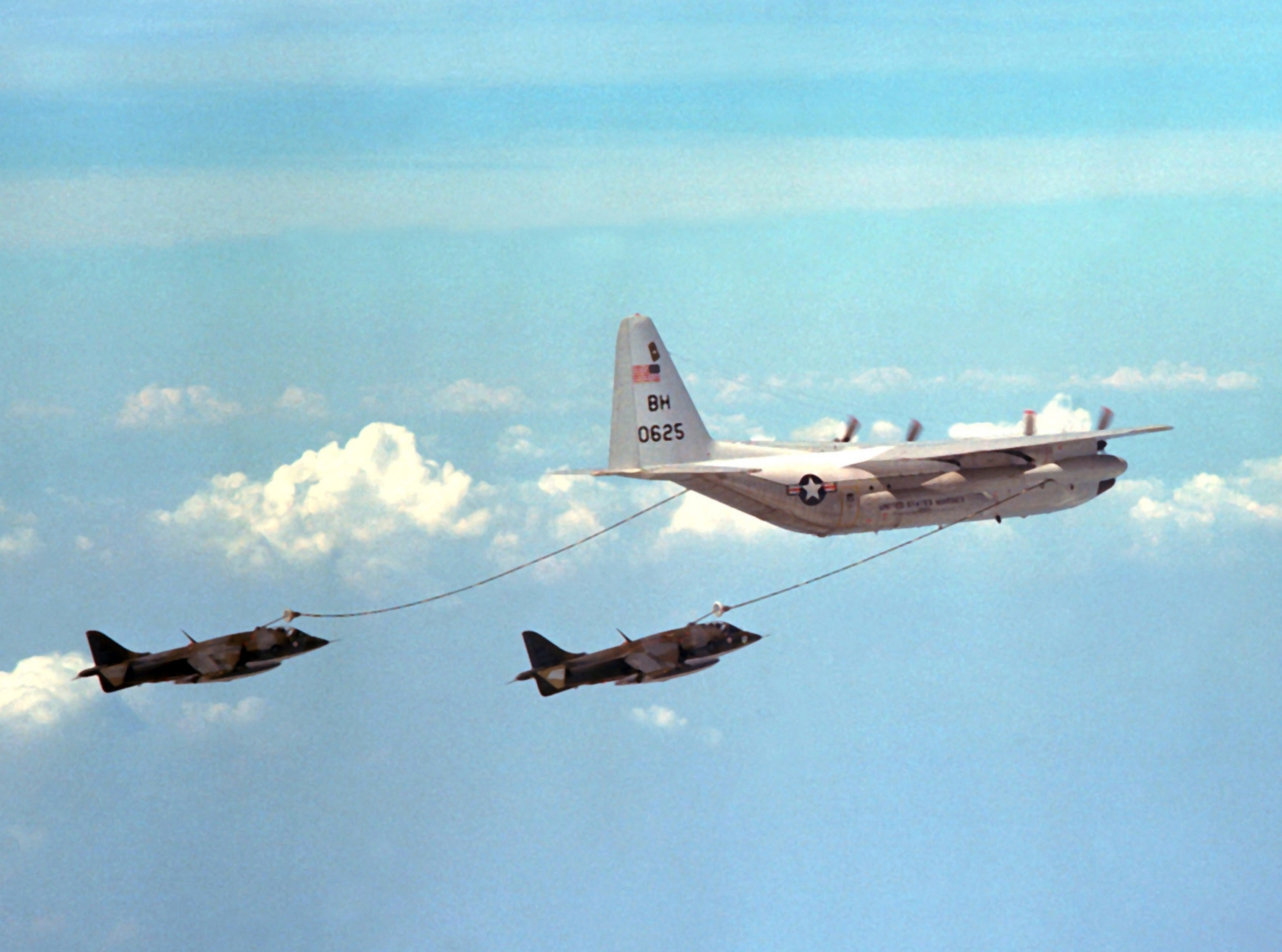
A VMGR-252 KC-130R refueling two Harriers, in 1978.

In December 1988, VMGR-252 surpassed 300,000 accident free flight hours and won the distinction of achieving the most accident-free flight hours of any squadron in the Marine Corps and Navy.

The decade of the nineties started in earnest with VMGR-252 deploying aircraft to Freetown, Sierra Leone in support of 22nd Marine Expeditionary Unit operations following civil unrest in nearby Liberia. The first night-vision-goggle landing of a Marine Corps KC-130 was accomplished in May 1990.

With little down time the squadron found itself facing an even greater challenge with the mobilization of forces for Operation Desert Shield. Six squadron aircraft were deployed to form VMGR-252 Detachment Alpha. When Operation Desert Storm commenced on 16 January 1991, the detachment transitioned to combat operations and provided over 10 million pounds of fuel to strike aircraft during the course of 937 combat sorties.

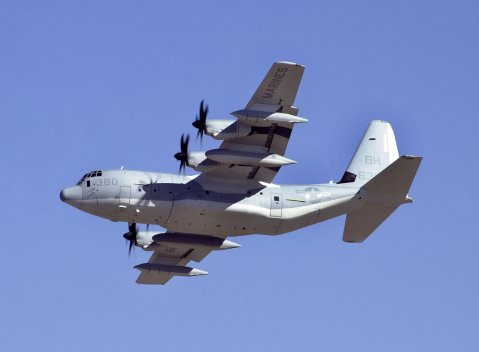
KC-130J of VMGR-252 in flight

During the remainder of the 1990s, the squadron continued to support East Coast Marine Expeditionary Units for operations in Kenya, Rwanda, the Republic of the Congo, Albania, Liberia, Sierra Leone, and Kosovo. They also continued support for taskings Operation Northern Watch and Operation Southern Watch.

=== The Global War on Terror ===
After the attacks on 11 September 2001, VMGR-252 formed the backbone of logistical and assault support operations during Operation Enduring Freedom in Afghanistan and provided similar support for the 26th Marine Expeditionary Unit in Iraq during Operation Iraqi Freedom in the spring of 2003. Approximately 30% of the squadron has been continuously deployed in support of Operation Iraqi Freedom since 2003.

In December 2002 VMGR-252 was equipped with three KC-130 J-model aircraft.

== See also ==
- United States Marine Corps Aviation
- List of active United States Marine Corps aircraft squadrons
- List of inactive United States Marine Corps aircraft squadrons
