= Flying W Airport =

Coordinates: 39.9341°N 74.8076°W

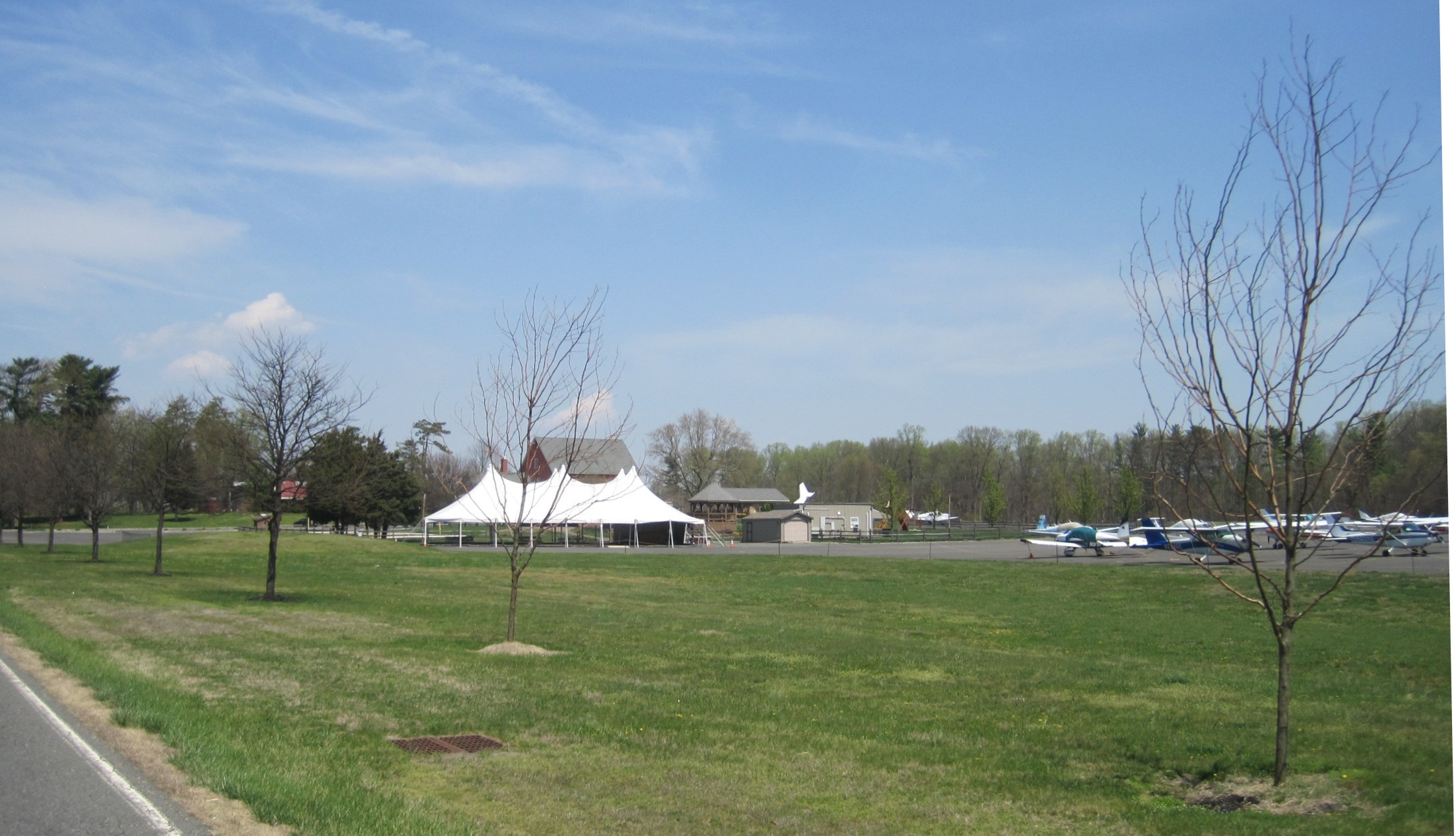
- Front of the restaurant / motel complex at the airport
- IATA: none; ICAO: none; FAA LID: N14

Summary
- Airport type: Public use
- Owner: Cave Holdings - Flying W, LLC
- Operator: Mindy Redner
- Serves: Lumberton and Medford townships
- Location: Burlington County, New Jersey
- Opened: 1964
- Elevation AMSL: 49 ft (15 m)

Map
- Interactive map of Flying W Airport

Runways
Direction	Length		Surface
Direction	ft	m	Surface
1/19	3,496	1,066	Asphalt

Statistics (2009)
- Aircraft operations: 74,222
- Based aircraft: 119
- Source: Federal Aviation Administration

Flying W Airport (FAA LID: N14) is a public-use airport located one nautical mile (1.852 km) southwest of the central business district of Lumberton, New Jersey in Burlington County, New Jersey, United States. The airport is privately owned. The address is 60 Fostertown Road, Medford, New Jersey 08055.

== Facilities and aircraft ==
Former Eastern Air Lines pilot William Whitesell opened the airport in 1961 as a Texas-themed fly-in resort, the Flying W Ranch. It grew into Flying W Airways (FWA) which invested heavily in the expected 1970s Alaska oil boom by funding an Alaska airline to fly Lockheed L-100 Hercules (civil version of C-130 military transport) aircraft for oil companies. In 1969, the airport hosted the first FWA Hercules, a large aircraft for such a small airport. But an open-ended environmental challenge delayed the expected boom, leading to the near-immediate bankruptcy (and ultimate shuttering) of FWA. The now non-operational airport was sold in bankruptcy in 1971, and not reopened until 1984.

Flying W Airport covers an area of 170 acres (69 ha) at an elevation of 49 feet (15 m) above mean sea level. It has one runway designated 01/19 with an asphalt surface measuring 3,496 by 75 feet (1066 x 22 m).

For the 12-month period ending February 19, 2009, the airport had 74,222 aircraft operations, an average of 203 per day: 100% general aviation. At that time there were 119 aircraft based at this airport: 85% single-engine, 8% helicopters and 7% multi-engine.

In 2016, the portion of the airport within Medford Township was proposed to be converted to a 450-unit housing complex by 2025. The deal would not affect the restaurant and motel complex within Lumberton Township.

The 28-room motel closed in October 2019. The 'Snack Shack' and bar closed in March 2020 as a result of the COVID-19 pandemic, but re-opened.

== Incidents and accidents ==
- September 8, 2017: Country music musician and vocalist Troy Gentry was killed in the 2017 Medford, New Jersey, helicopter crash. The accident was primarily attributed to the pilot's "failure to maintain rotor rpm” due to issues with the mechanics in the an aircraft, thus making it near impossible for the pilot to land safely. The pilot James Evan Robinson was killed on impact. Gentry died in the local hospital not long after.
