= MarkAir =

Alaska bush, freight & jet passenger airline (1947–1995)

MarkAir; Alaska International Air; Interior Airways
IATA	ICAO	Call sign
BF; KA/BF^{(1,2)}	MRK; KA/BF^{(1,2)} IAI	MARKAIR; INTERLAS; INTERIOR
- Commenced operations: 1947 as Interior Airways; 21 July 1972 as Alaska International Air; 12 January 1984 as MarkAir
- Ceased operations: October 24, 1995
- Operating bases: Denver; Anchorage; Sagwon; Fairbanks
- Fleet size: See Fleet below
- Destinations: See Destinations below
- Headquarters: Anchorage, Alaska, U.S.
- Key people: Neil Bergt
- Founder: Jim Magoffin
- Employees: 931 (1991)

Notes
- (1) code changed from KA to BF between Feb 1980 and June 1982; (2) Before the mid 1980s, two-letter IATA codes also served as ICAO codes

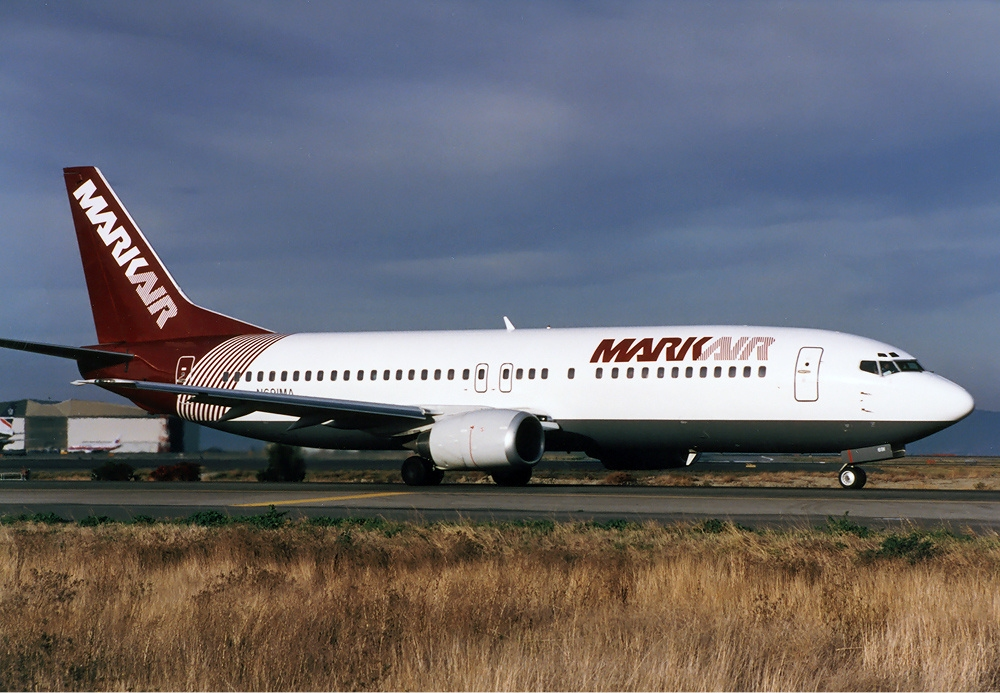
Boeing 737-400 in 1992

MarkAir was an Alaska jet carrier operating from 1984 to 1995 that started after World War II as Interior Airways (later Alaska International Air (AIA)). Interior Airways grew from founder Jim Magoffin's bush pilot activities to pioneering flying freight to Alaska's North Slope (facing the Arctic Ocean), first in the 1950s for the military and then later, as an intrastate airline, playing a key role in supporting oil exploration in the 1960s (that resulted in the Prudhoe Bay Oil Field), including flying Lockheed L-100 Hercules aircraft into gravel strips laid down on tundra (or in the case of AIA, onto icebergs).

In the 1970s, after the airline was renamed AIA, leadership shifted to Neil Bergt, who ultimately ended up with complete ownership. Bergt oversaw AIA's support of the construction of the Alaska pipeline and engineered the abortive consolidation of AIA plus Wien Air Alaska with Western Airlines soon after US airline deregulation in the early 1980s. In 1984, Bergt changed AIA's identity again to MarkAir to pursue passenger service. MarkAir dominated much of the intra-Alaska market and demonstrated consistently high profitability, despite which the mercurial Bergt at one time said he hated the airline. In 1991, MarkAir shifted from cooperating to competing with Alaska Airlines, leading to two bankruptcies. By its 1995 demise, MarkAir service had shifted entirely to the Lower 48 in a failed attempt to be a low-cost carrier.

== History: Interior Airways ==
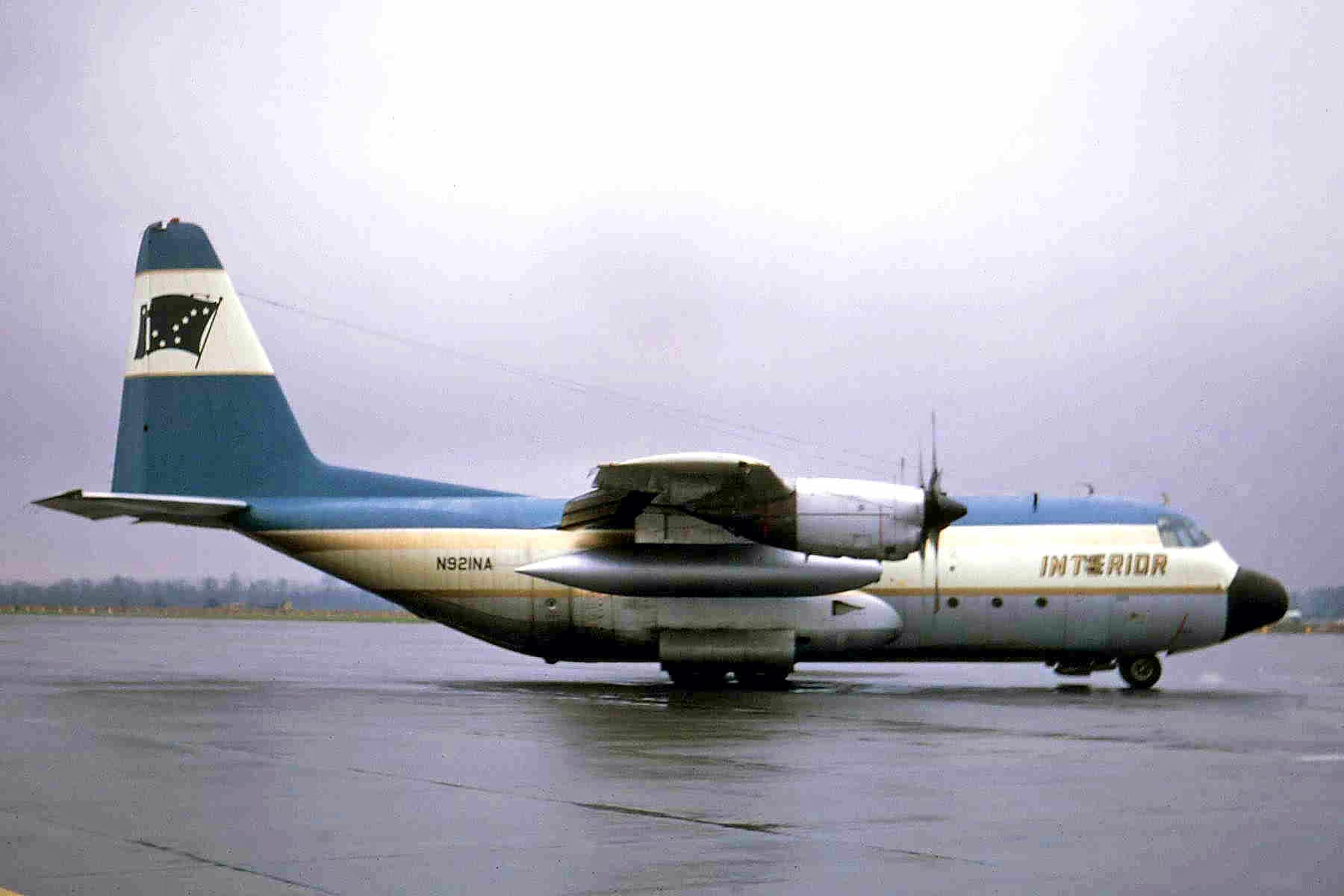
L-100 Hercules Gatwick January 1970. Wrecked at Fletcher's Ice Island in 1973, N921NA was rebuilt on-site, then returned to service only to explode in 1974. See text

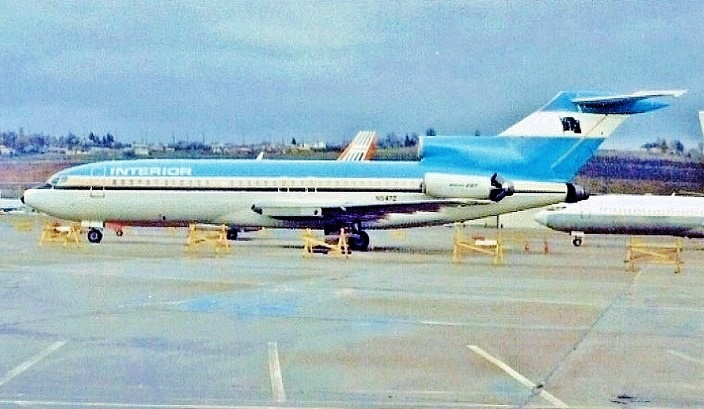
Boeing 727-24C in November 1969. Serial 19525 N5472 ex-Continental aircraft, Interior never took delivery

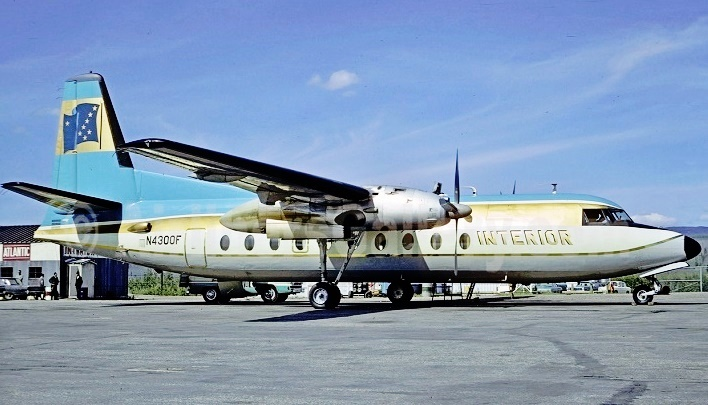
Fairchild F-27

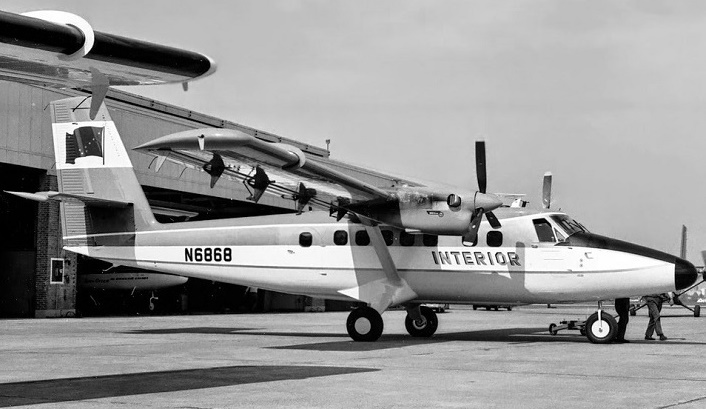
DHC-6 Twin Otter

=== Startup ===
Jim Magoffin was from a family of outdoorsmen; his father participated in the Klondike Gold Rush. Magoffin was a lieutenant colonel in the pilot training command of the Army Air Corps during World War II. After the war, he supplemented his pay working as a mining engineer in Fairbanks by purchasing a single-engined Taylorcraft and marketing bush pilot services from 1947 as Interior Airways. Magoffin's wife Dot was a key figure at Interior, a multiengine-qualified pilot fully comfortable in the back country.

=== DEW Line and BMEWS ===
Interior slowly added larger light aircraft and employees until it got a contract supporting construction of the DEW Line prototype in 1953 on the North Slope. Flying conditions were some of the most challenging in the world. With almost all supplies flown in, Interior upgraded to handle volume, first to Beech 18s and then, after the prototype was successful, DC-3s and C-46s to support DEW Line build out, including a C-46, N1663M, bought from future billionaire Kirk Kerkorian (see External links for a photo of this aircraft). After DEW Line construction ended in 1957, Interior supported Ballistic Missile Early Warning System (BMEWS) construction at Clear Air Force Station in the late 1950s. But in 1961, policy changes required the US military contract only with airlines certificated by the Civil Aeronautics Board (CAB), the now-defunct Federal agency that then tightly regulated almost all US air transportation. Without a CAB certificate, Interior had to shrink in the early 1960s, falling back on civilian business.

=== Intrastate airline ===
Certification remained a problem. Operating DC-3s and C-46s required certification, but given the DEW Line's national importance, Interior received a waiver to fly these aircraft. Thereafter, Interior was in a battle with the CAB (and CAB-certificated competitors) over this issue. Conflict ended when Alaska became a state in 1959 and made Interior an intrastate airline in 1962. Interior was well connected within Alaska. For example, future US Senator Frank Murkowski was on the board of directors.

=== Oil ===
North Slope oil development drove the fortunes of Interior (and later, AIA) in the 1960s and 1970s. Exploration started in 1959 and culminated in the 1968 discovery of oil at Prudhoe Bay Oil Field. The only viable transportation for Prudhoe Bay oil was a pipeline, but construction was unexpectedly blocked in 1970 by native Alaskans seeking compensation for use of their lands and by environmentalists who leveraged the newly passed National Environmental Policy Act (NEPA) to force the writing of an environmental impact statement. Development remained on hold until Congress intervened in the wake of the 1973 oil crisis, resulting in the pipeline getting the go-ahead in early 1974. There followed an enormous economic boom, powered through 1977 by pipeline construction and thereafter by oil royalties and taxes flowing to the state.

=== 1960s exploration ===
To support oil exploration, in 1964 Interior built its own North Slope base at a site it named Sagwon, equipped with runway lights for night operation and a control tower. Interior needed larger aircraft, initially a Lockheed Constellation and Fairchild C-82s, but in 1968, Lockheed L-100 Hercules (see External links for a short video of an Interior Airways Hercules flight from Fairbanks to Sagwon). A 1969 article noted how just one drilling site required 140 Hercules loads to get to the point of being ready to drill. Everything came by air, including Caterpillar tractors and earth moving equipment that used Sagwon as a base camp to drive 75 miles over tundra to get to the site, create its own landing strip, with everything else flown directly to the site, including housing modules and diesel fuel. At the time, environmental regulation was almost non existent. Sagwon's accommodations were nicknamed the Sagwon Hilton and Armpit Arms.

Also in 1968, Interior, in response to requests to improve existing service, briefly offered scheduled flights with Fairchild F-27s between Anchorage and Fairbanks. Wien Air Alaska responded by adding jets to the route, after which Interior withdrew.

=== Bankruptcy ===
Anticipating pipeline construction in 1970, Interior was caught short by the delay and declared bankruptcy July 27, 1970, unable to service Hercules debt; the reduction in revenue was severe: $26.2 million (over $230 million in 2025 dollars) in 1969 to only $9.0 million in 1970. Two other Alaska carriers flew Hercules: Red Dodge Aviation (RDA), which filed for bankruptcy in September and Alaska Airlines, which pioneered the use of Hercules in Alaska in 1965. RDA did not survive bankruptcy, ceasing operations February 1972. Alaska Airlines escaped bankruptcy, but experienced heavy losses in 1970 and 1971 and exited the Hercules business in 1972. Interior survived, re-emerging from bankruptcy in April 1971. In May, Neil Bergt was appointed president. Interior shed aircraft and people, by year-end 1971 it had only 65 employees, down from 480 before the crisis. In 1969, there had been 13 Hercules aircraft in Alaska. In summer of 1972, there was only one, controlled by Interior. Interior had others but they were flying outside the US, which is why, in June, it changed its name to Alaska International Air.

== History: Alaska International Air ==
L-100 Hercules Fairbanks 1973. Recently acquired from Saturn Airways; still with Saturn registration and partial livery

=== Hercules specialist ===
Interior Airways flew a diverse fleet (see Fleet), at one time 42 aircraft across 13 types. AIA slimmed down to only Hercules, which, without pipeline revenue, it turned to operating globally. In 1973, 58% of its revenue came from foreign operations. Magoffin and Bergt both credited AIA's London agents (Chapman and Freeborn) with sourcing AIA's international revenue. Chapman Freeborn is, as of 2025, a global air charter broker that, in turn, credits AIA as its founding client. AIA Hercules flew all over the earth as well as right next door in Canada.

=== Fletcher's Ice Island ===
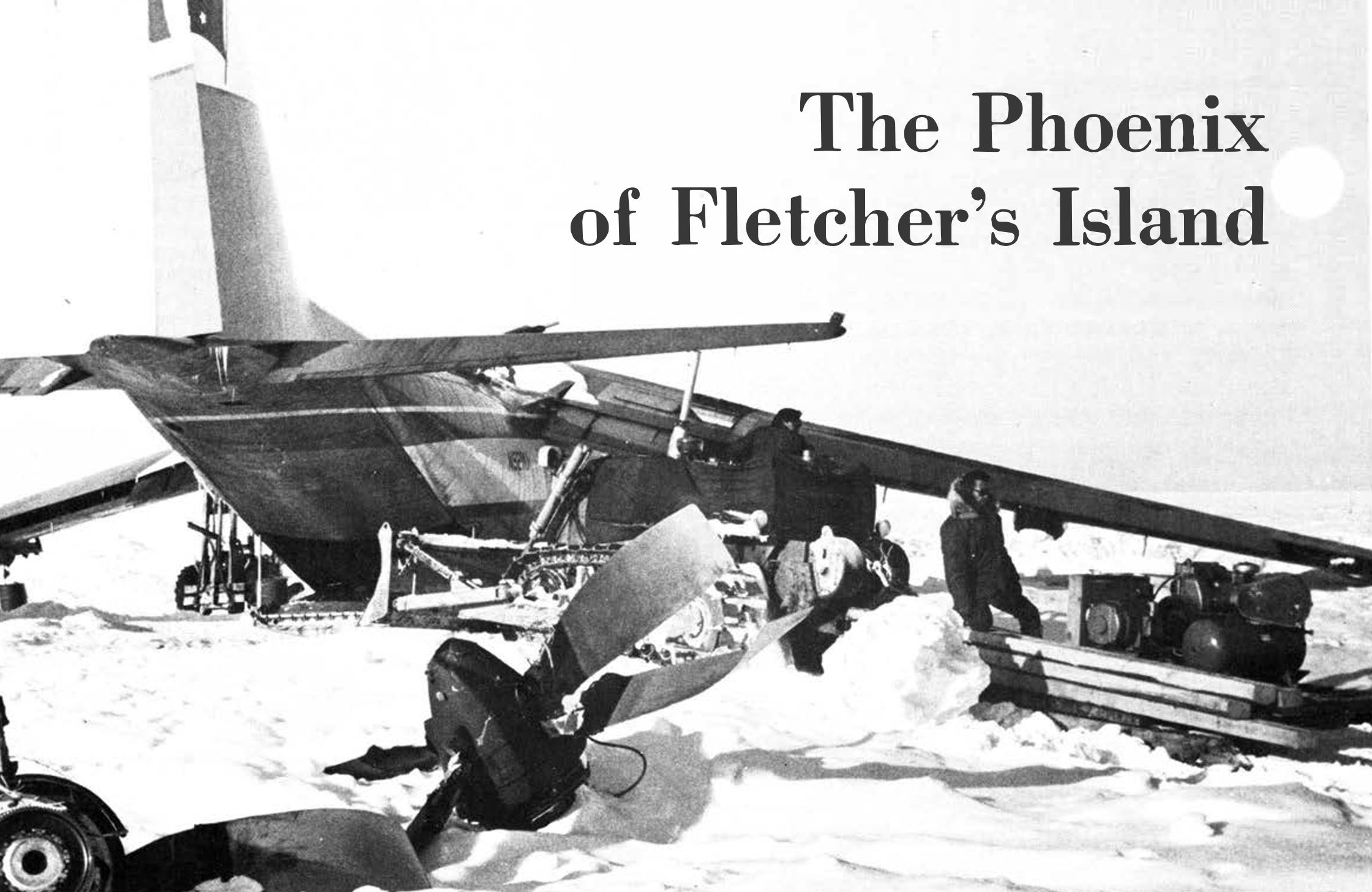
Wrecked Hercules at Fletcher's Ice Island with small tractor, 1973. Clipping from FAA publication. Twisted propeller in foreground

AIA contracted to supply Fletcher's Ice Island, a flat seven mile by three mile iceberg then 1500 miles from Fairbanks (the iceberg moved, especially in summer, no trivial matter pre-GPS) with a research facility and a runway. In February 1973, an AIA Hercules, on landing, hit ice ridges not visible from the air, tearing off the wings and causing other severe damage. AIA bought the wreck from the insurance company for $68,000 for parts, but maintenance manager Art Walker proposed rebuilding it on site, in the open, on top of an iceberg, in the midst of the Arctic Ocean. AIA sourced a replacement wing, flown in by another Hercules, installed with a small hoist that could barely lift the weight. Repairs took a team of mechanics over six months. The top of the iceberg melted during summer; mechanics worked in waders in ice-cold water when not on rafts. With the runway partly melted, they relied on air-drops. In November (temperatures now 40 below or worse) the aircraft, certified for a ferry flight by a Federal Aviation Administration (FAA) inspector flown in for the purpose, flew in stages to Fairbanks and then returned to service May 1974. The FAA awarded Art Walker for outstanding achievement. But in August, the aircraft, in the midst of unloading a delivery of gasoline in Alaska, exploded, killing the flight engineer. See Accidents and incidents for 30 August, 1974.

In 1955, United States Overseas Airlines also recovered a write-off on ice when an aircraft landed on frozen Hudson Bay.

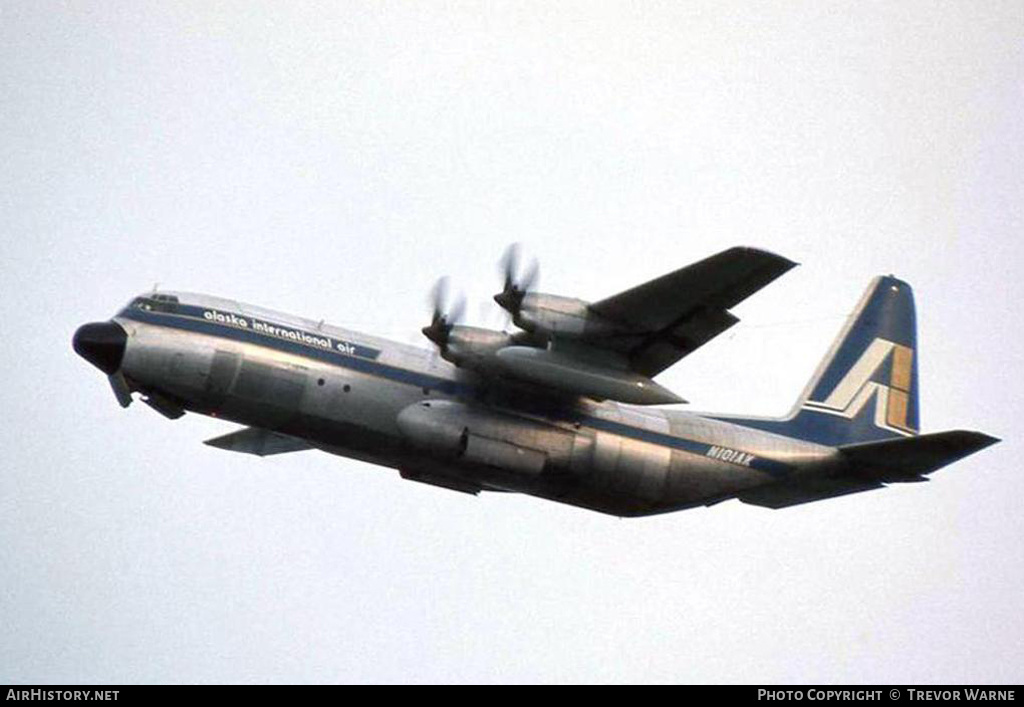
L-100 Hercules 1977

=== Boom and diversification ===
In 1974, pipeline construction started and AIA boomed. It had an Alaska Hercules monopoly; Alaska was determined to protect its own. For instance, in October 1975, the CAB allowed Saturn Airways, a California carrier, to fly 26 Hercules loads for the military within Alaska, saying the material originated out of state, making it interstate commerce. The state threatened to fine Saturn and Alaska's Senators called for hearings in Washington. The Anchorage Daily News ran a front-page banner headline on the matter. During the most intense period, AIA's Hercules utilization averaged 13 block hours/day, with individual aircraft flying 21 block hours in a day (a flight's block hours are the gate-to-gate time). The bigger competition was road. In October 1975, a bridge across the Yukon River was completed, the last link in the haul road (today, the Dalton Highway) that paralleled the pipeline path north of Fairbanks. There was now a land link to the North Slope, reducing dependence on Hercules. AIA anticipated this, buying an Alaskan trucking firm in 1973, and in 1975, further diversified with a construction company, all under the umbrella of Alaska International Industries (AII). AIA/AII revenues increased dramatically from $12.8 million in 1973 to $89.1 million in 1975 (over $500 million in 2025 dollars). By year-end 1976, AII was the largest "homegrown" company in Alaska.

=== Overseas National Airways ===
AIA could fly within Alaska and outside the US. It could not fly elsewhere in the US nor between the US and outside the US. As previously mentioned, it was also barred from most military contracts. In September 1976, AIA bid for Overseas National Airways (ONA), a supplemental air carrier (the CAB's term for a charter carrier). ONA's traffic rights filled AIA's gaps, but it was a very different carrier from AIA.

ONA's main business was passenger charters to Europe. It had exited domestic air freight and ended an unsuccessful foray into hotels, riverboats and cruises. It also recently lost two DC-10 widebody aircraft within two months, luckily without loss of life. It wanted a buyer.

But banks were skeptical and did not back AIA's bid, which lapsed in December.

=== Great Northern ===
Great Northern Airlines; Fairbanks Air Service
IATA	ICAO	Call sign
OU	GNA; FAS	Great Northern; Fairbanks
- Commenced operations: April 1944 as Fairbanks Air Service; 13 October 1975 as Great Northern Airlines
- Ceased operations: October 10, 1980 merged into Alaska International Air
- Operating bases: Anchorage; Fairbanks
- Fleet size: See Fleet below
- Destinations: See Destinations below
- Headquarters: Anchorage, Alaska; Fairbanks, Alaska; United States
- Key people: K. Gene Zerkel; George S. Patterson; Joe Usibelli; Hawley Evans
- Founder: Bud Seltenreich

In early 1978, the Fairbanks unemployment rate hit 18% as the Alaska economy endured a post-pipeline completion hangover. AII shut its trucking subsidiary at the end of 1978. Its construction subsidiary shrank. Neil Bergt first acquired AII stock after AIA emerged from bankruptcy. By 1979, he had a 30+% stake and in that year he bought the rest.

In January 1980, AII agreed to buy Great Northern Airlines (GNA). GNA started as Fairbanks Air Services (FAS) in April 1944, providing light aircraft sales/service and a flight school. Jim Magoffin's first aviation job in Alaska was as a FAS instructor pilot. FAS's business mix evolved over several ownership changes, and included a small commuter airline up through the late 1970s. In the 1970s FAS bought Lockheed L-188 Electra turboprops, mostly used for freight. In 1975 it changed its name to GNA, and in 1978 moved to Anchorage. In 1979, the CAB certificated GNA as a scheduled carrier on a few routes to remote Alaska communities. CAB approval of the GNA acquisition occurred a month later, the CAB now being relaxed about freight transactions. AII wanted GNA for its scheduled route authority. GNA and AIA ran in parallel until the CAB allowed AII to fold GNA into AIA in September 1980. AIA's ambitions clearly went beyond freight, however; in December 1980 it ordered two Boeing 767s for delivery in 1983, which it said it planned to run in passenger service between Alaska and the US west coast.

=== Wien Air Alaska and Western Airlines ===
In November 1981, Bergt agreed to buy Wien Air Alaska for $50 million in cash from Household International, a consumer finance company that bought Wien in 1979. Bergt planned to run Wien separately from AIA. At the time, Wien was just slightly smaller by revenue than Alaska Airlines, the other Alaska jet airline. In 1981, Wein had $181 million in revenue and was profitable. Bergt's plan was to give AIA's 767s to Wien, change its name and refocus it on the Lower 48. Then, in December, Western Airlines appointed Bergt CEO and said it would buy Wien. In 1981 Western ranked 12th out of US passenger carriers by revenue ($1.06 billion with net loss of $73 million). Western's former CEO resigned after failing to merge with Continental, leaving Western with an acting CEO. As part of the deal, Western was to buy Wien from Bergt in return for a 48.5% stake in Western. Bergt said he talked his way into the Western CEO position by contacting the executive search committee, who had no idea who he was. Bergt cut Western's costs, increased aircraft utilization and realigned its route network to create a hub in Salt Lake City.

In July 1982, the CAB approved a Western-Wien merger, but objected to joint control of Wien and AIA. There were Alaskan markets where the combination of Wien and AIA effectively eliminated cargo competition. The CAB required Bergt to give up day-to-day control of AIA for an 18-month period, during which time the CAB would decide if further steps needed to be taken to preserve competition. In October Bergt called off both his acquisition of Wien and the Western-Wien merger, unwilling to jeopardize control of AIA. In April 1983 Bergt resigned from Western.

=== Passenger airline ===
In December 1982, AIA traded in its 767 orders for orders for six 737-200s, two of which were immediately leased to Western, the others scheduled for delivery in 1984–1985. In January, AIA said it would launch passenger service as soon as May, and almost immediately walked it back, citing inability to get lower wages from pilots. But in October, AIA applied to the CAB for passenger service.

== History: MarkAir ==
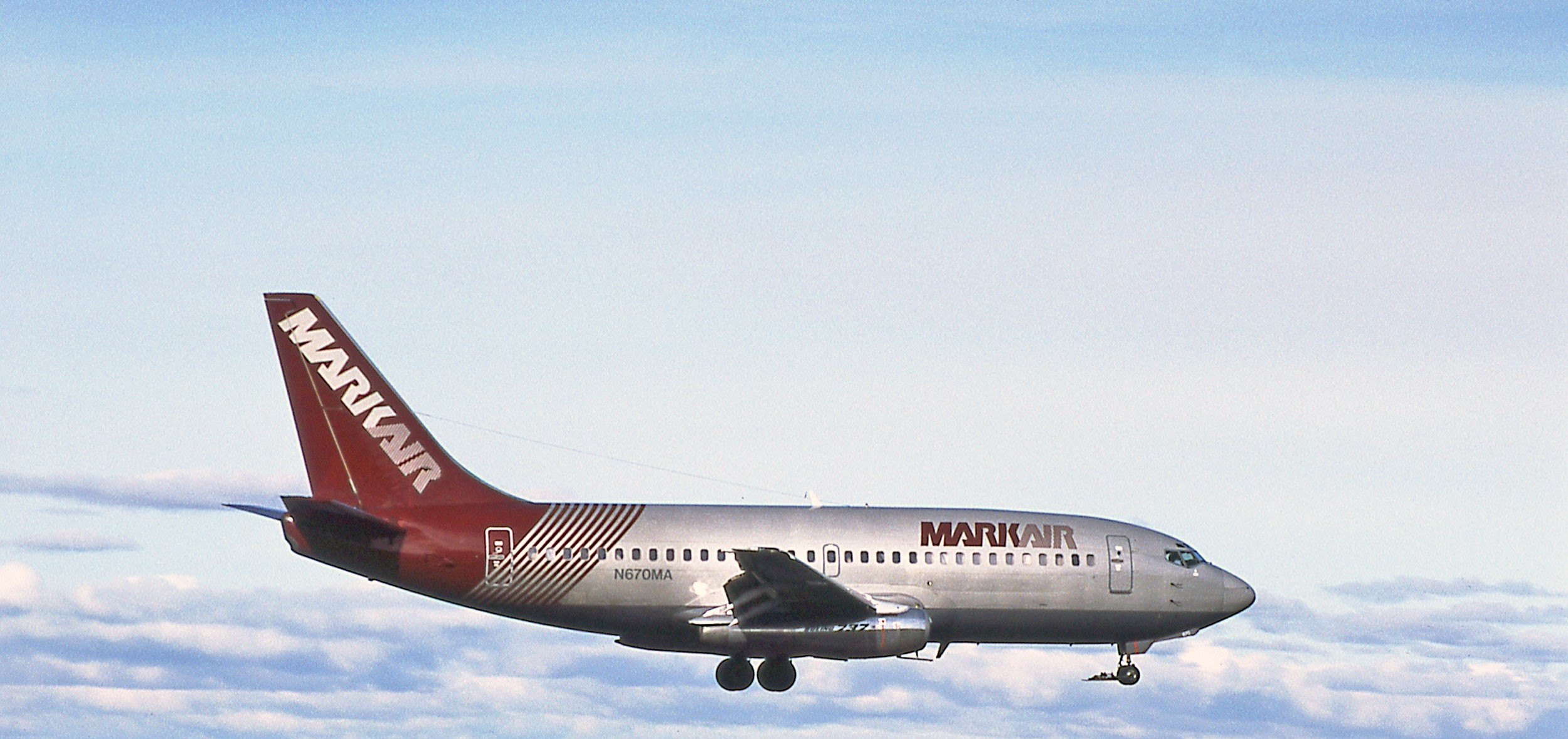
Boeing 737-200C N670MA in 1985. N670MA would be destroyed landing at Unalakleet in 1990, luckily without loss of life. See Accidents and incidents

=== Bumping Wien aside ===
Passenger service started as MarkAir on 1 March. Bergt agreed when Wien's CEO said there was were not room for three passenger airlines in Alaska. AIA's scheduled cargo service had grown to 17 routes in Alaska; passenger service was the next step. "MarkAir" was a late choice after Northern Air Cargo objected to "NorthAir." Two weeks after the first flight, MarkAir bought Wien's Alaska ground facilities for $22.5 million. In November, Wien filed for bankruptcy and ceased operations. Merrill Wien, son of Wien founder Noel Wien, later said Wien was liquidated "by a corporate raider" for about twice what it was bought. If liquidation of Wien was or became the goal, it was assisted by MarkAir's purchase of Wien's Alaska ground facilities; Wien's president bought the airline just the prior year for only $37 million.

Wien's exit was timely. As the nearby table shows, MarkAir's 1984 financial results were extremely poor; by early 1985 the airline was unable to pay its bills. Bergt admitted he overestimated the market. A lessor repossessed one 737 and sued MarkAir for another after the airline barricaded the aircraft for a month to prevent removal. MarkAir acknowledged it missed the payments, but said the lessor had an unusually large deposit for this contingency. A judge agreed. The elimination of Wien resulted in a complete turnaround in MarkAir's results in 1985.

MarkAir Financial Results, 1984 thru 1995^{(1)}(1) As filed with Department of Transportation (2) Partial year
USD 000	1984	1985	1986	1987	1988	1989	1990	1991	1992	1993	1994	1995^{(2)}
Operating revenue:												
Scheduled passenger		38,879	45,796	44,141	53,374	59,561	72,806	65,029	69,704	118,425	193,735	70,519
Freight, mail, other		43,972	39,423	39,499	45,744	44,688	55,497	55,645	42,180	33,994	27,628	6,758
Total	58,095	82,851	85,219	83,640	99,118	104,249	128,303	120,674	111,884	152,419	221,363	77,277
Op profit (loss)	(11,671)	10,936	16,412	12,818	15,450	16,168	15,846	4,277	(29,732)	(1,823)	3,530	(10,531)
Net profit (loss)	(20,759)	(2,496)	20,280	2,448	3,160	2,680	7,858	1,117	(37,972)	(21,816)	(10,180)	(20,632)
Op margin (%)	-20.1	13.2	19.3	15.3	15.6	15.5	12.4	3.5	-26.6	-1.2	1.6	-13.6

=== MarkAir Express ===
MarkAir Express; Hermens Air
IATA	ICAO	Call sign
BF 2E	MRX; HRM	Speedmark; Hermens
- Commenced operations: 1974; 7 August 1987 as MarkAir Express
- Ceased operations: April 11, 1996
- Operating bases: See Destinations below
- Fleet size: See Fleet below
- Destinations: See Destinations below
- Headquarters: Anchorage, Alaska; Bethel, Alaska; United States
- Founder: Stan Hermens

On 7 August 1987, MarkAir bought Bethel-based Hermens Air, a commuter airline operating mostly single-engined aircraft, founded by Stan Hermens, a former Oregon smokejumper who, unable to find work as a pilot, worked as a licensed plumber and flew his aircraft to jobs, from which Hermens Air developed. See External links for a photo of a Hermens aircraft. MarkAir renamed the airline to MarkAir Express. In March 1989, MarkAir Express acquired Galena Air Service, in operation since 1968, after its owner died. MarkAir Express attracted attention for its attempt to dominate third-tier Alaskan interior flying, competitors said it was the subject of a Department of Justice anti-trust investigation. MarkAir Express organized operations into outlying Alaskan hubs (in 1991 there were over a dozen), each serving local communities, total points served exceeding 100. For instance, Kodiak was connected to over a dozen communities, Bethel to over two dozen.

=== Innovative marketing ===
MarkAir had marketing innovations, some remembered decades later. Two that got attention:

- Alaska Permanent Fund deals. Alaska residents receive an annual dividend from the Alaska Permanent Fund. MarkAir initially, in exchange for a dividend check, provided travel worth twice the amount. Later, MarkAir exchanged PFD checks for up to five round-trip tickets. Alaskans reminisced about this 40 years later.
- A free airline ticket for all Alaska graduating high school seniors.

=== Flying for the CIA ===
In 1986 MarkAir flew Hercules to the Honduras border with "non-lethal" aid for the Nicaraguan Contras, contracted by the State Department. Bergt said that to the best of his knowledge, MarkAir and its predecessors had never flown for the Central Intelligence Agency (CIA), but he wanted to. At the time, Congress was debating allocating money for the Contras through the CIA, Bergt hoped to get some of it, "[a]nd if it's guns and ammunition, I could care less. So long as my airplanes don't get shot at and Lloyd's of London insures them, I could care less." Bergt complained MarkAir only got what Southern Air Transport, a Hercules operator secretly owned by the CIA until 1973, did not take. In 1987 Bergt apparently got his wish, as it was reported MarkAir flew that year for the CIA. MarkAir refused to comment.

=== Relationship with Alaska Airlines ===
MarkAir agreed to fly on behalf of Alaska Airlines on three jet routes from Anchorage as of October 1985. MarkAir shut its own frequent-flyer program August 1986 and joined that of Alaska Airlines, a "better offering." Later that year the Alaska Airlines agreement extended to a fourth jet route. Alaska Airlines and MarkAir largely split the state between them, though they still competed on a few big markets like Anchorage-Fairbanks. Bergt offered to sell MarkAir to Alaska Airlines several times over the years. In June 1991 Bergt commented he believed MarkAir to be worth $250 million (over $525 million in 2025 dollars), so it appears a sale, and a sale price, was again on his mind. That year new Alaska CEO Ray Vecci made changes Bergt didn't like. Bergt tried to force a sale in October but Alaska didn't bite. Vecci would later refer to the attempt to sell MarkAir to Alaska as a kind of extortion. Later in October, MarkAir announced it would compete with Alaska on the Seattle route and intra-Alaska routes MarkAir previously avoided, and in response Alaska ended the codeshare and frequent flyer agreements. 1991 was a poor year to sell an airline; it was the second-worst year ever for the industry, according to the Air Transport Association. Others questioned why MarkAir chose to attack Alaska Airlines going into the slow winter season.

=== MarkAir bankruptcy 1 ===
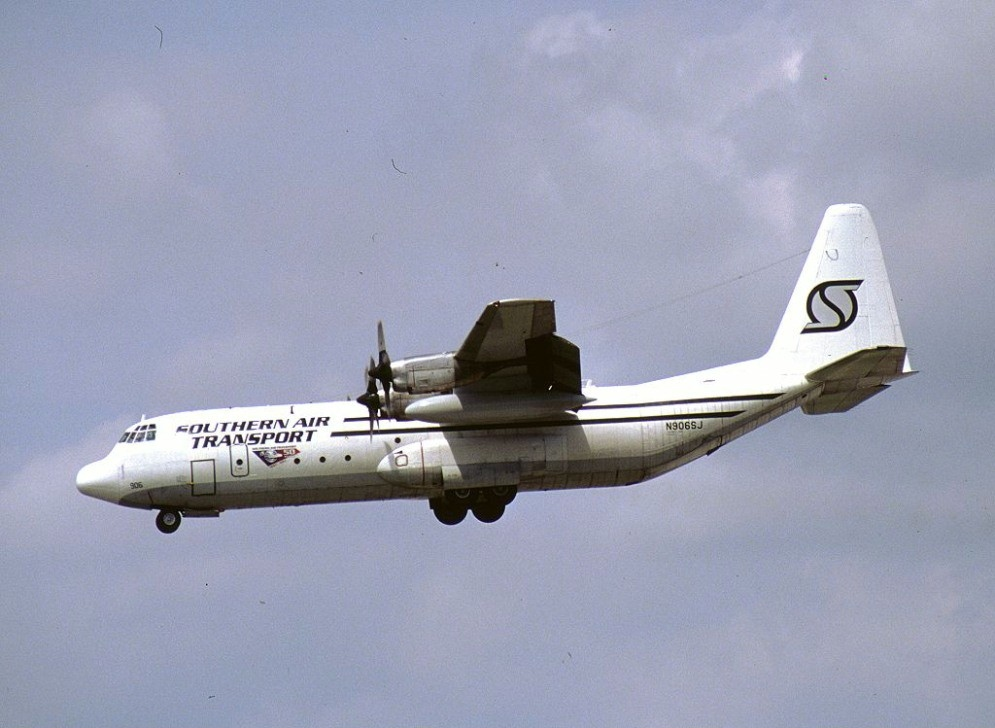
Former MarkAir L-100-30 in Southern Air Transport service in 1998 (Lockheed construction number 4477)

MarkAir filed Chapter 11 on 8 June 1992, less than eight months after announcing it would compete against Alaska Airlines. MarkAir had doubled the number of 737s to 12, expanded into Alaska Airlines markets and engaged in a fare war. Right from the start, however, it showed a need for cash. An industry analyst, after the fact, noted MarkAir should have raised money before going after Alaska, not after. It announced (but did not execute—the timing was "atrocious") a public offering (which, at the time, valued MarkAir at $100 million, much less than the $250 million Bergt said it was worth), sold its Fairbanks hangars to the state and perhaps most striking of all, sold the remaining Hercules fleet to Southern Air Transport, abandoning the 20+ year old Hercules cargo business that, a decade earlier, Bergt kept in preference to controlling much bigger Western.

=== Expansion into Lower 48 ===
Two months into bankruptcy, MarkAir announced flights beyond Seattle to California, Las Vegas and Phoenix. By the time it emerged from Chapter 11, 21 months later, MarkAir flew to 15 Lower 48 destinations, a way of getting out from under Alaska Airlines. Lessors, facing a terrible aircraft market, chose to leave aircraft at MarkAir but the airline faced a cash-crunch going into the winter 1992. Attempts to borrow were fought by other lenders. An end-of-year Alaska Permanent Fund Dividend (PFD) deal, which other airlines did not match (the next year, both Alaska and Delta participated), saved the day. Sales of $18 million vastly exceeded expectations and raised sufficient cash to tide the airline over. Alaska retailers referred to MarkAir as having cornered much of available PFDs that year. A reorganization plan that nominally paid unsecured creditors 100 cents on the dollar (and left Bergt's ownership essentially untouched) was approved in June 1993, but MarkAir took until March 1994 to emerge. The airline materially underperformed summer 1993 projections, and then failed to sell MarkAir Express to a California dentist at the end of 1993 to cover the cash shortfall. On exiting bankruptcy, MarkAir soon had problems paying its bills.

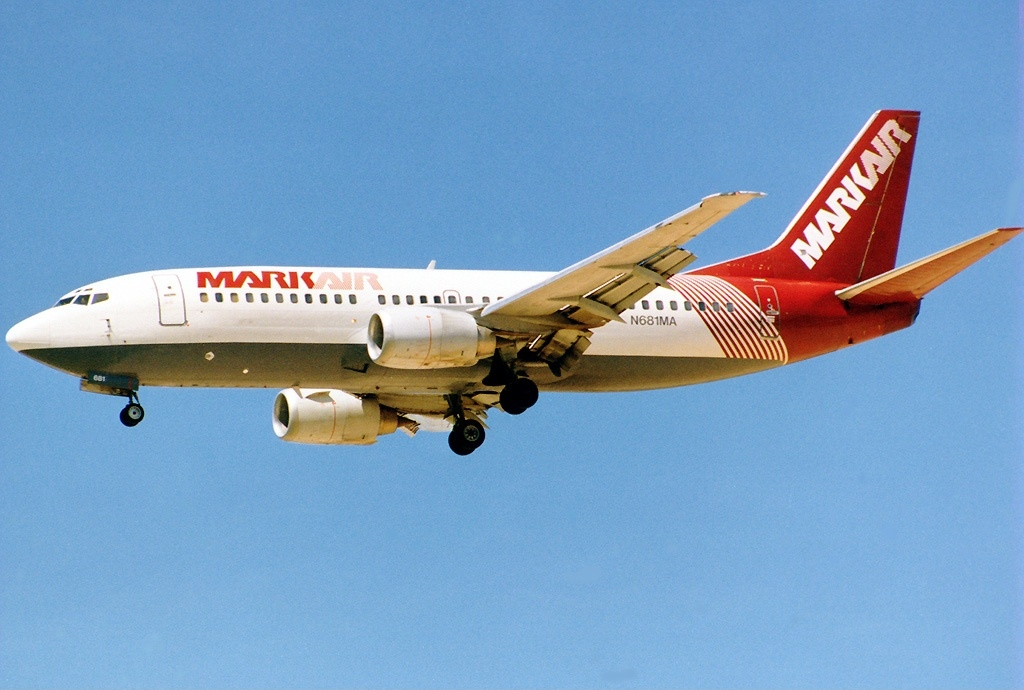
Boeing 737-300 Las Vegas 1993

By September 1994, MarkAir had 17 flights/day from Denver and a total of 15 jets in its system. Bergt talked of being a quarter billion dollar (sales) carrier on the way to $1 billion. The airline was being wooed by Denver which saw MarkAir as filling a need for a low-cost carrier at the about-to-open Denver International Airport (DIA), which looked like it was going to be somewhat empty. Continental Airlines had just exited its Denver hub. There was talk of Denver extending a $30 million loan in return for MarkAir moving to that city But rating agencies said DIA's credit could be negatively affected, and in November the city passed on the deal. Further, Denver-based Frontier Airlines started operation July 1994. In January 1995, MarkAir asked Alaska for a $40 million loan. But in March a state panel unanimously rejected the plea.

=== MarkAir bankruptcy 2 ===
On 14 April 1995, little more than a year after emerging from bankruptcy, MarkAir filed again. On April 19, MarkAir announced its withdrawal from Alaska, moving remaining operations to Denver. The market for Boeing 737s was now more robust and lessors wanted their aircraft back, leaving MarkAir with six Boeing 737s and stranding MarkAir's Alaskan carriers and most Alaskan employees. In August, the airline was shut down for about a week by the FAA, unhappy with MarkAir's record keeping. But in October, Boeing demanded its aircraft back after MarkAir missed payments, leaving the airline with too few aircraft to operate. The airline's last day was October 24. Bergt blamed the regulators.

=== Aftermath ===
Without MarkAir competition, other airlines were notably less aggressive in making PFD offers at the end of 1995.

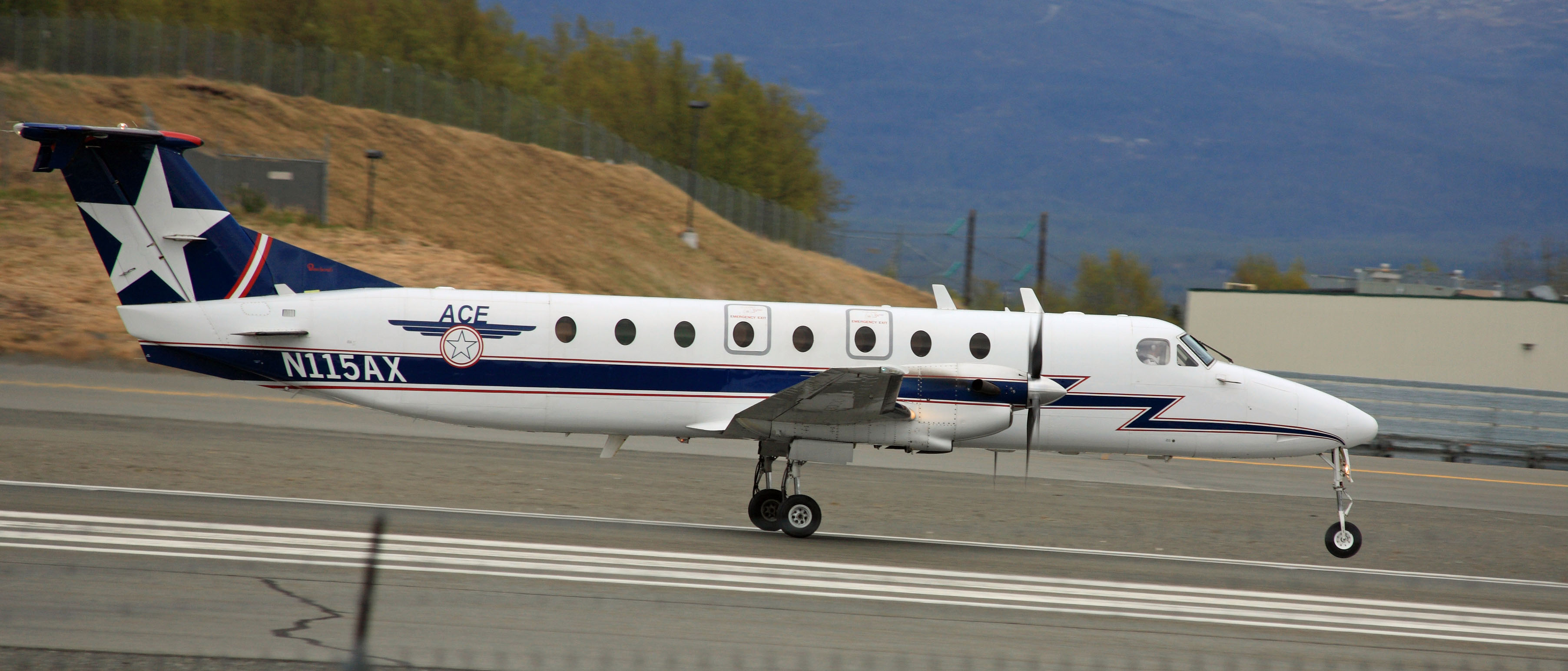
Alaska Central Express Beech 1900C at Anchorage 2011

MarkAir Express was not included in the second MarkAir bankruptcy. But in November 1995, it too entered Chapter 11, with a plan to cease almost all passenger flying and fly cargo. It shrank from 40 aircraft to four and laid off most of its employees, but Bergt saw it as a viable vehicle. In March 1996, the Bergt family made an offer to buy MarkAir Express out of bankruptcy. Northern Air Cargo submitted a higher bid, on the condition it could immediately shut the company, which ceased operation April 11, 1996. But later in the year, Mike Bergt popped up again, now running Alaska Central Express, a small cargo carrier flying former MarkAir Express aircraft.

=== Neil Bergt ===
Neil Bergt was criticized for MarkAir's fate and his leadership. In 1990, filings from Bergt's divorce from his second wife showed he treated MarkAir, and its predecessor, AIA, as a piggybank. The company financed construction of a $7 million San Diego mansion, put its staff of six on the payroll and provided Bergt with loans to back an opulent lifestyle (including paying for a Rolls Royce for his wife). MarkAir paid Bergt a $3 million salary at the time the CEO of much larger Alaska Airlines made only $500,000. Shortly after the decision to compete with Alaska, the FDIC (which had taken over a bank) sued MarkAir for $7 million in unpaid Bergt loans MarkAir had guaranteed. During the first MarkAir bankruptcy, the FDIC sent marshals to raid Bergt's homes to recover assets. The FDIC also tried to seize his AII and MarkAir stock. A month after the second MarkAir bankruptcy, Bergt filed personal bankruptcy, the Internal Revenue Service after him for unpaid MarkAir taxes.

Bergt apparently planned on attacking Alaska Airlines in 1992, but chose to bring it forward to November 1991, to the mystification of MarkAir executives. The decision to fly against Alaska at all bewildered observers. A stock analyst said it was "suicidal". He made his then 31-year-old son, Mike Bergt, president of MarkAir and MarkAir Express shortly after declaring the first bankruptcy. After announcing the attack against Alaska Airlines, he said he hated MarkAir and that "[o]f course I'd sell this damn airline. Sell it in a heartbeat." Shortly before the first MarkAir bankruptcy, he publicly referred to Alaska Airlines as "pigs." In another interview, Bergt referred to Alaska CEO Vecci, who was Italian-American, short and balding, as "Danny DeVito." He threw things in internal meetings. A former VP characterized him as akin to an abusive parent, the environment chaotic, Bergt unwilling to listen to ideas not his own. Creditors noted that investors were interested in MarkAir, just not so long as Bergt was in charge. MarkAir employees in Fairbanks, fired after the second bankruptcy, made their feelings known by roasting two whole pigs, one dubbed Neil, the other Mike.

== Destinations ==
Great Northern Airlines, year-end 1979:

- Anchorage
- Fairbanks
- Kotzebue
- Nome
- Prudhoe Bay

Alaska International Air, 1 July 1983: (all locations Alaska; names per AIA timetable)

- Anchorage
- Aniak
- Barrow
- Bethel
- Cold Bay
- Dillingham
- Dutch Harbor
- Fairbanks
- Galena
- King Salmon
- Kotzebue
- McGrath
- Nome
- Point Hope
- Prudhoe Bay
- St. Marys
- Unalakleet

MarkAir, 8 June 1991: (all points Alaska, names per MarkAir, passenger service only. Points in bold were MarkAir Express hubs)

- Adak
- Anchorage
- **Aniak**
- Barrow
- **Bethel**
- **Cold Bay**
- **Dillingham**
- **Dutch Harbor**
- **Fairbanks**
- **Galena**
- **Homer**
- Kenai
- **King Salmon**
- **Kodiak**
- **McGrath**
- Prudhoe Bay
- **St. Mary's**
- Sand Point
- **Unalakleet**
- Valdez

In addition, Port Heiden was a 1991 MarkAir Express hub not served by MarkAir.

MarkAir, 2 January 1995: (names per MarkAir timetable)

- Anchorage
- Atlanta
- Baltimore
- Barrow
- Bethel
- Chicago
- Cincinnati
- Dallas/Ft. Worth
- Denver
- Dutch Harbor
- Fairbanks
- Juneau
- Kansas City
- Kotzebue
- Las Vegas
- Los Angeles
- Minneapolis/St. Paul
- New York LaGuardia
- Nome
- Phoenix
- Prudhoe Bay
- Reno
- San Diego
- San Francisco
- Seattle

== Fleet ==
Interior Airways, September 23, 1970:

- 1 Lockheed L-100-10 Hercules
- 2 Lockheed L-100-20 Hercules
- 2 Fairchild C-82A
- 2 Fairchild F-27
- 5 Curtiss C-46
- 3 De Havilland Canada DHC-6 Twin Otter
- 3 De Havilland Canada DHC-2 Turbo Beaver
- 2 De Havilland Canada DHC-2 Beaver
- 3 Twin Beech
- 1 Beech Twin Bonanza
- 1 Beech King Air
- 1 Beech Queen Air
- 4 Grumman G-44 Super Widgeon
- 2 Cessna 180

World Airline Fleets 1979 (copyright 1979) shows Alaska International Air with:

- 5 Lockheed L-100-30 Hercules

And Great Northern Airlines with:

- 3 Curtiss C-46F Commando
- 2 Lockheed L-188C Electra
- 2 Lockheed L-188F Electra

1987-88 World Airline Fleets (copyright 1987) shows MarkAir with:

- 5 Boeing 737-200C
- 4 Lockheed L-100-30 Hercules

And Hermens Air with:

- 11 Cessna 207A Stationair 7/8
- 7 Cessna 208 Caravan I
- 2 Cessna 172RG
- 1 Cessna 185 Skywagon
- 1 Cessna 402C
- 1 Cessna 404 Titan
- 1 De Havilland Canada DHC-2 Turbo Beaver
- 1 Piper PA-34-200T Seneca II

Markair fleet as of 14 March 1989:

- 5 Boeing 737-200C
- 3 Lockheed L-100-30 Hercules
- 1 De Havilland Canada Dash 7
- 2 De Havilland Canada Dash 8-300 on order (delivered March 1991)

== Accidents and incidents ==
- 16 January 1965: Interior Airways Fairchild C-82A Packet N208M was on a ferry flight from Ft Yukon, AK to Fairbanks, AK when it ran into icing conditions, forcing the aircraft down near Beaver, AK. The crew of three was unharmed, but the aircraft was a writeoff. The crew had failed to get a weather briefing before departure.
- 13 July 1969: The pilot of Interior Airways SCAN 30 (French-built Grumman G-44A Widgeon) N58Q failed to manage a hard landing on Elusive Lake, AK, inbound from Sagwon, and the aircraft sank. Both pilot and passenger died. Pilot received his type rating on the aircraft only 12 days earlier.
- 7 September 1969: Interior Airways de Havilland Canada DHC-6 Twin Otter 100 N2711N was approaching Sagwon on a flight from Fairbanks, AK, weather was significantly worse than expected, the aircraft hit the ground at a 30 degree bank and both pilots perished. The captain was cited for improper IFR operation.
- 30 January 1972: Interior Airways de Havilland Canada DHC-6 Twin Otter 200 N6767 was lost in a hangar fire at Fairbanks, AK.
- 28 February 1973: Alaska International Air Lockheed L-100 Hercules N921NA landed on Fletcher's Ice Island, hitting unexpected ice ridges on the runway, causing wings to rip off and other severe damage, a write off. The salvaged wreck was rebuilt and re-entered service. See Fletcher's Ice Island above.
- 30 August 1974: Alaska International Air Lockheed L-100 Hercules N100AK exploded at Galbraith Lake, Alaska while unloading gasoline. The flight engineer died of burns almost three weeks later. This was the same aircraft, construction number 4209, rebuilt on Fletcher's Ice Island.
- 30 October 1974: Alaska International Air Lockheed L-100 Hercules N102AK en route from Fairbanks to Dietrich Pass, crashed near Old Man's Camp, Alaska, after its wing separated in turbulence, killing all four crew members aboard. Metal fatigue and insufficient airline inspection were blamed. AIA sent two sistership aircraft to Lockheed to have the relevant section pre-emptively replaced.
- 11 December 1974: Fairbanks Air Service Lockheed L-188AF Electra N400FA carrying a load of fuel from Fairbanks slid off the runway at Deadhorse, AK on landing, one of the engines broke off and fire ensued. Crew safe but aircraft a writeoff.
- 27 March 1975: Fairbanks Air Service Curtiss C-46A-45-CU Commando N4860V on flight from Anchorage to Deadhorse, AK cancelled the IFR landing to execute a VFR landing, landed short, broke off landing gear, attempted to go around, but belly-landed instead. Pilot cited for poor judgment.
- 12 March 1976: Great Northern Airlines Lockheed L-188AF Electra N401FA carrying a load of fuel landed downwind on a slippery runway at Udrivik Lake, AK on a flight from Fairbanks, ground-looped to avoid going off the end of the runway, the landing gear collapsed and fire broke out. Crew safe but aircraft a writeoff.

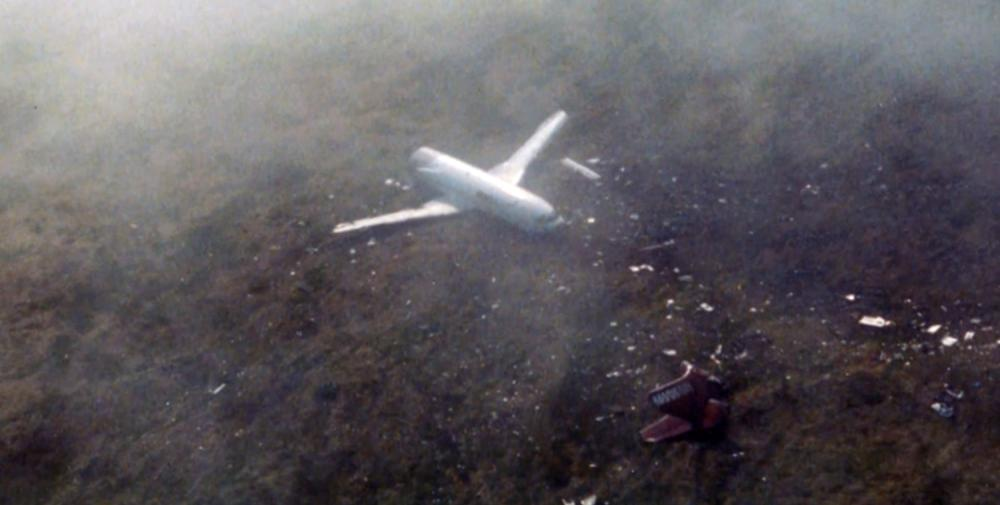
Wreckage of Flight 3087

- 5 January 1979: Great Northern Airlines Lockheed L-188PF Electra N403GN undershot the runway at Inigok, AK on a flight from Umiat, the aircraft was a write off, crew of six and nine passengers survived. Crew cited for not going around.
- 2 June 1990: MarkAir flight BF3087, a Boeing 737-2X6C N670MA, from Anchorage, crashed 7.5 miles short of runway 14 at Unalakleet destroying the aircraft and injuring four crew, one (a flight attendant) seriously, the only souls on board, when the cockpit crew descended prematurely.

== See also ==
- List of defunct airlines of the United States
- Alaska Airlines
- Red Dodge Aviation
