= Lockheed L-100 Hercules =

Turboprop transport aircraft

L-100 Hercules
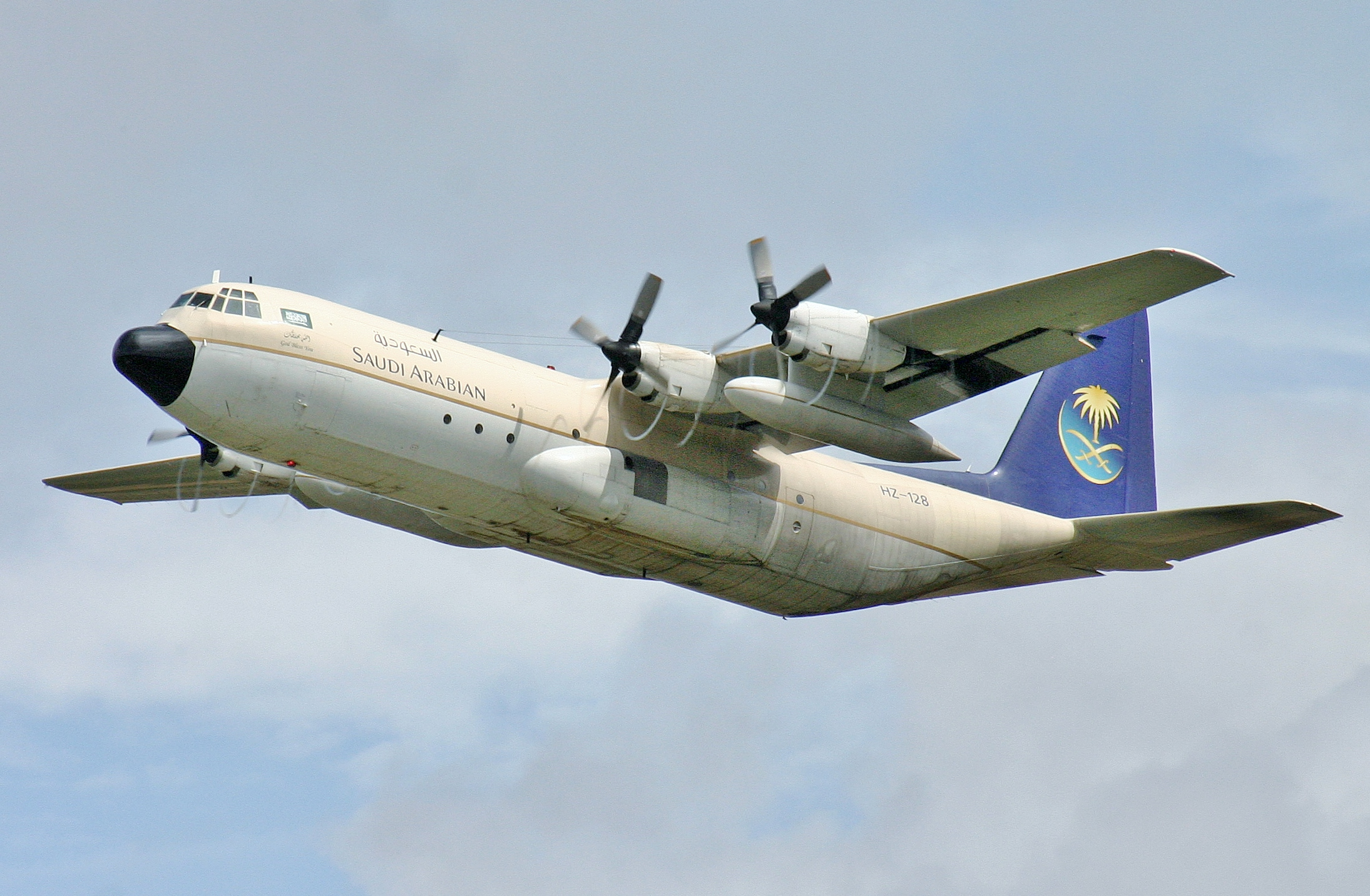
- A Saudia L-100-30 during RIAT 2011

General information
- Type: Civilian cargo aircraft
- National origin: United States
- Manufacturer: Lockheed; Lockheed Martin (LM-100J)
- Status: In service for cargo transport (L-100); Flight testing (LM-100J)
- Primary users: Indonesian Air Force Safair; Lynden Air Cargo; Transafrik International
- Number built: 114

History
- Manufactured: 1964–1992, 2018–present (LM-100J planned)
- Introduction date: September 30, 1965
- First flight: April 20, 1964 (L-100); May 25, 2017 (LM-100J)
- Developed from: Lockheed C-130 Hercules; Lockheed Martin C-130J Super Hercules

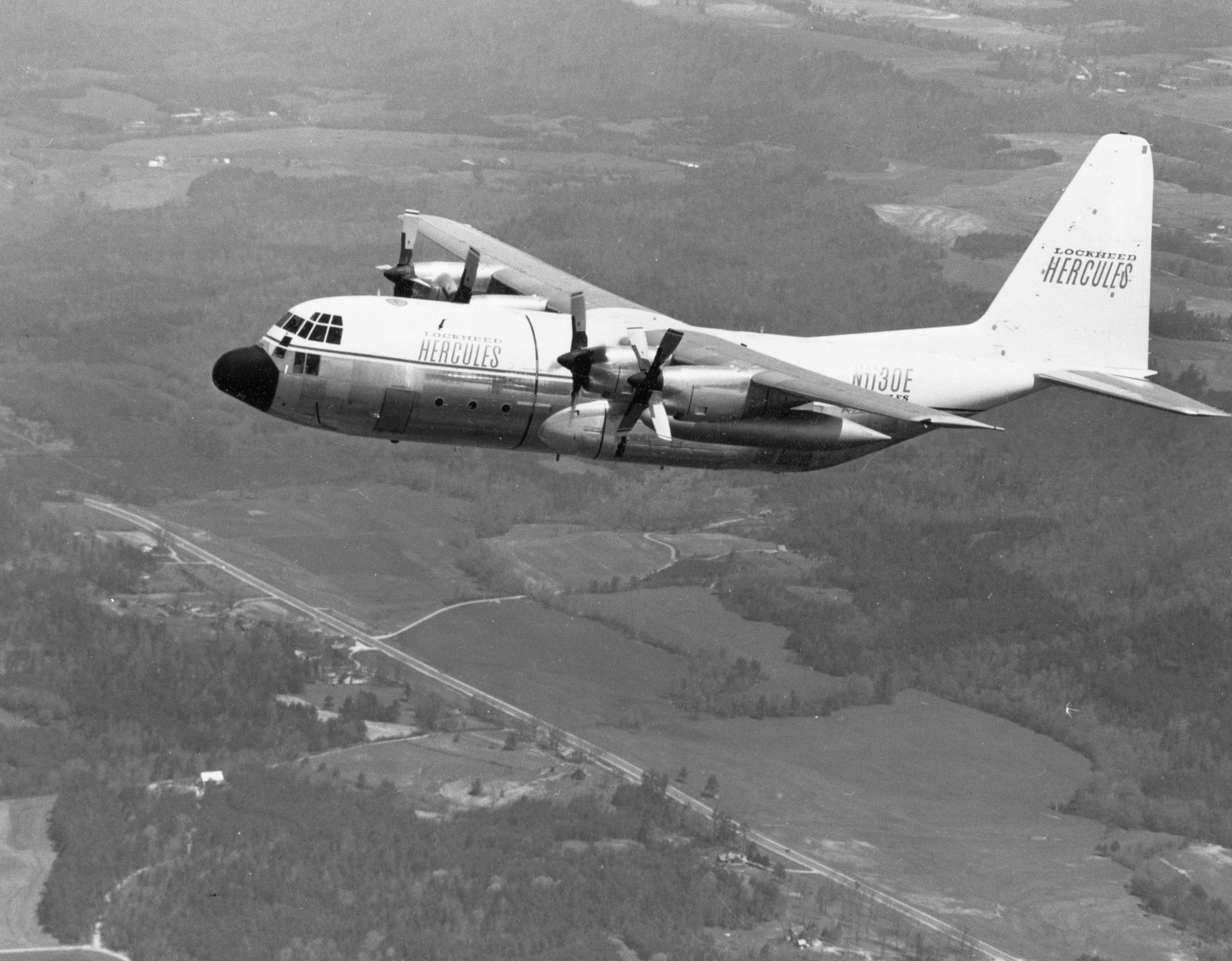
L-100 prototype, construction number 3946

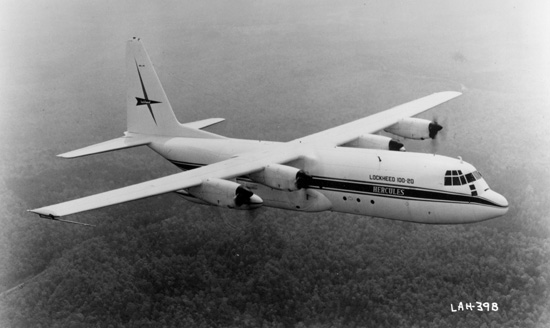
L-100-20 prototype, same aircraft as original prototype, 3946, after stretch. This aircraft briefly flew for Red Dodge Aviation

The Lockheed L-100 Hercules is the civilian variant of the C-130 Hercules military transport aircraft made by the Lockheed Corporation. Its first flight occurred in 1964. Longer L-100-20 and L-100-30 versions were developed; despite this, L-100 production ended in 1992 with 114 aircraft delivered. An updated variant of the model, LM-100J, completed its first flight in Marietta, Georgia on 25 May 2017, and started mass production in 2019. L-100 and LM-100J aircraft can be distinguished from the C-130 and C-130J military versions by the absence of side and forward windows underneath the main windshield.

== Development ==
In 1959, Pan American World Airways (Pan Am) ordered twelve of Lockheed's GL-207 Super Hercules to be delivered by 1962, to be powered by four 6,000 eshp Allison T56 turboprops; however, Pan Am never took delivery of these aircraft. Slick Airways was to receive six such aircraft later in 1962. The Super Hercules was to be 23 ft 4 in (7.11 m) longer than the C-130B; a variant powered by 6,445 eshp Rolls-Royce Tynes and a jet-powered variant with four Pratt & Whitney JT3D-11 turbofans were also under development.

In 1960, Zantop Air Transport won a USAF Logair domestic cargo contract for bulky freight by agreeing to purchase five Lockheed C-130B transports that were to be commercially certificated by Lockheed. The agreement foundered when Zantop and Lockheed were unable to agree on financing terms.

The prototype L-100 (registered N1130E) first flew on April 20, 1964, when it carried out a 25-hour, 1 minute flight, the longest first flight of a commercial aircraft at the time. The type certificate was awarded on 16 February 1965. Twenty-one production aircraft were then built with the first delivery to Continental Air Services, Inc (CASI), a wholly owned subsidiary of Continental Airlines, on September 30, 1965.

The stretched L-100-30 version was certificated in October 1970. In addition, Lockheed rebuilt some L-100-20s to L-100-30s.

A prominent L-100 user was Interior Airways, an Alaska bush operator, and its corporate successor, Alaska International Air (AIA), which used the aircraft to fly to short gravel or snow/ice runways in the far north of Alaska. In the 1970s, AIA was a pure L-100 operator (operating not only within Alaska but globally), and for regulatory reasons had an effective monopoly on the use of the L-100 for most purposes to support construction of the Alaska pipeline in the mid-to-late 1970s. When pipeline construction was unexpectedly delayed, a local L-100 competitor established for that purpose, Red Dodge Aviation, went out of business, and the pioneering civilian operator of the L-100, Alaska Airlines, exited the L-100 business in the early 1970s.

In 1974, AIA crashed an L-100 on Fletcher's Ice Island, a massive iceberg floating in the Arctic Ocean, which hosted a Navy station, complete with runway. The aircraft was a write-off, but a team of AIA mechanics subsequently rebuilt the aircraft on-site in challenging conditions, in the open, including installation of a whole new wing, over a six-month period. The aircraft returned to Alaska in stages and returned to service after additional work.

A substantial user of the L-100 in the 1970s and 1980s were the civilian contractors of the US military domestic air cargo networks, Logair (United States Air Force) and Quicktrans (United States Navy). Contractors included Airlift International, Saturn Airways, Trans International Airlines and Southern Air Transport. During the 1970s, Quicktrans transitioned entirely to the L-100, becoming the sole type through Quicktrans's 1994 end. Within Logair, the L-100 aircraft was one of the aircraft types used from the late 1960s through program end in 1992. The largest L-100 operator in the world was often whichever airline had the L-100 part of the Logair/Quicktrans contract.

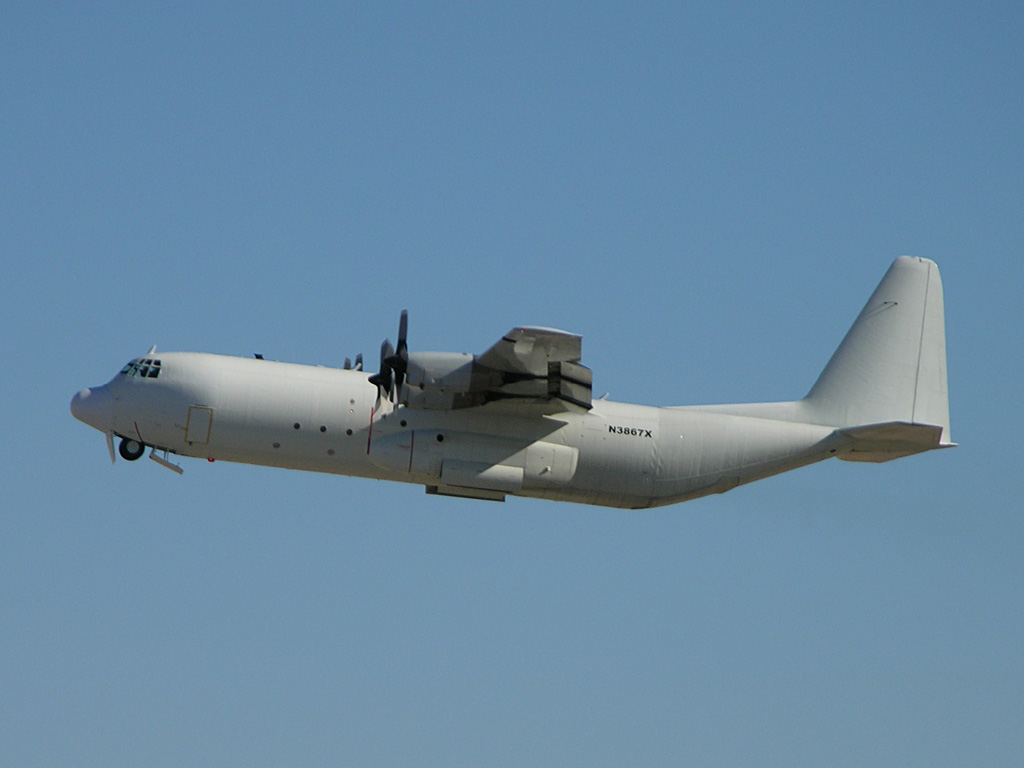
A Tepper Aviation L-100-30

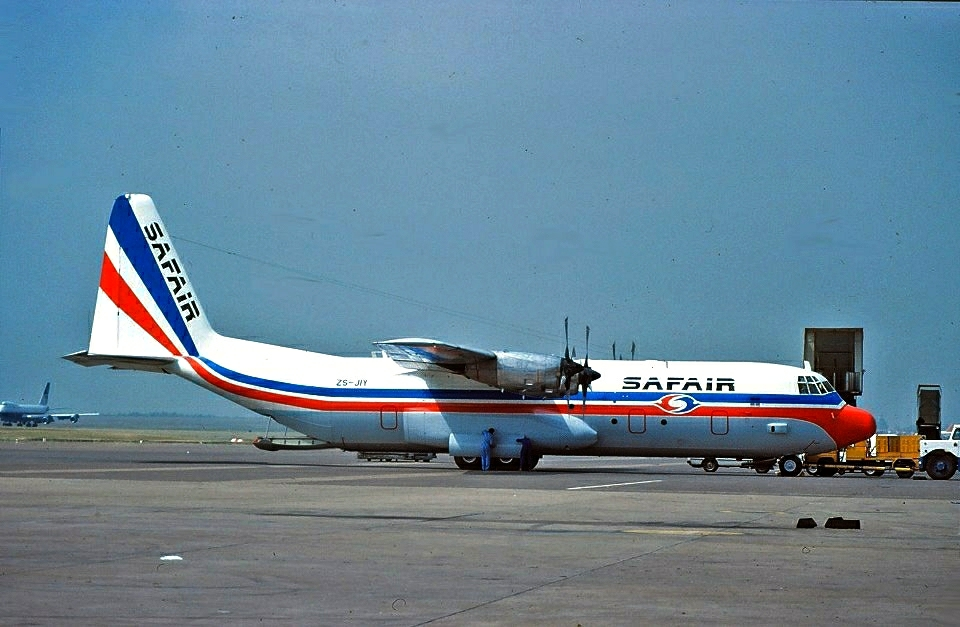
A Safair Lockheed L-100-30

Deliveries totaled 114 aircraft, with production ending in 1992. Several L-100-20 aircraft were operated on scheduled freight flights by Delta Air Lines between 1968 and 1973.

An updated civilian version of the Lockheed Martin C-130J-30 Super Hercules was under development, but the program was placed on hold indefinitely in 2000 to focus on military development and production. On February 3, 2014, Lockheed Martin formally relaunched the LM-100J program, saying it expects to sell 75 aircraft. Lockheed sees the new LM-100J as an ideal replacement for the existing civil L-100 fleets.

The launch operator for the LM-100J was Pallas Aviation: from 2019 they would operate two aircraft from Fort Worth Alliance Airport in the United States. By early March 2022 the four LM-100J aircraft (tail numbers N96MG, N71KM, N67AU and N139RB) then owned by Pallas had begun flying numerous flights, numbering at least 522 by May 16, 2024, between Ramstein AB and secondary military air facilities at Nowe Miasto nad Pilicą (EPNM), Poland; Boboc (LRBO), Romania; Sliač (LZSL), Slovakia; Lielvārde (EVGA), Latvia and Aalborg (EKYT), Denmark. A fifth and final LM-100J, N91BU, was delivered to Pallas Aviation in August 2023. In early June 2024, Larry Gallogly, Lockheed's director, customer requirements for air mobility and maritime missions said, “We have not seen robust demand for the commercial variant of the [LM-100]J, so we haven't had follow-on customers.”

== Variants ==
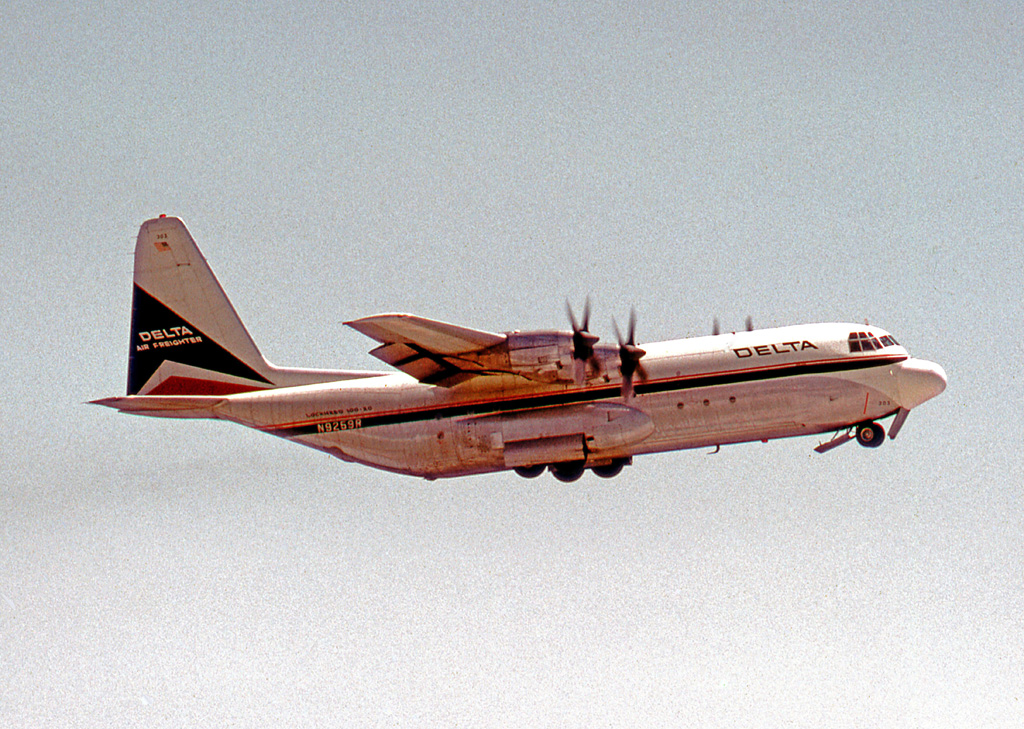
A Lockheed L-100-20 of Delta Air Lines

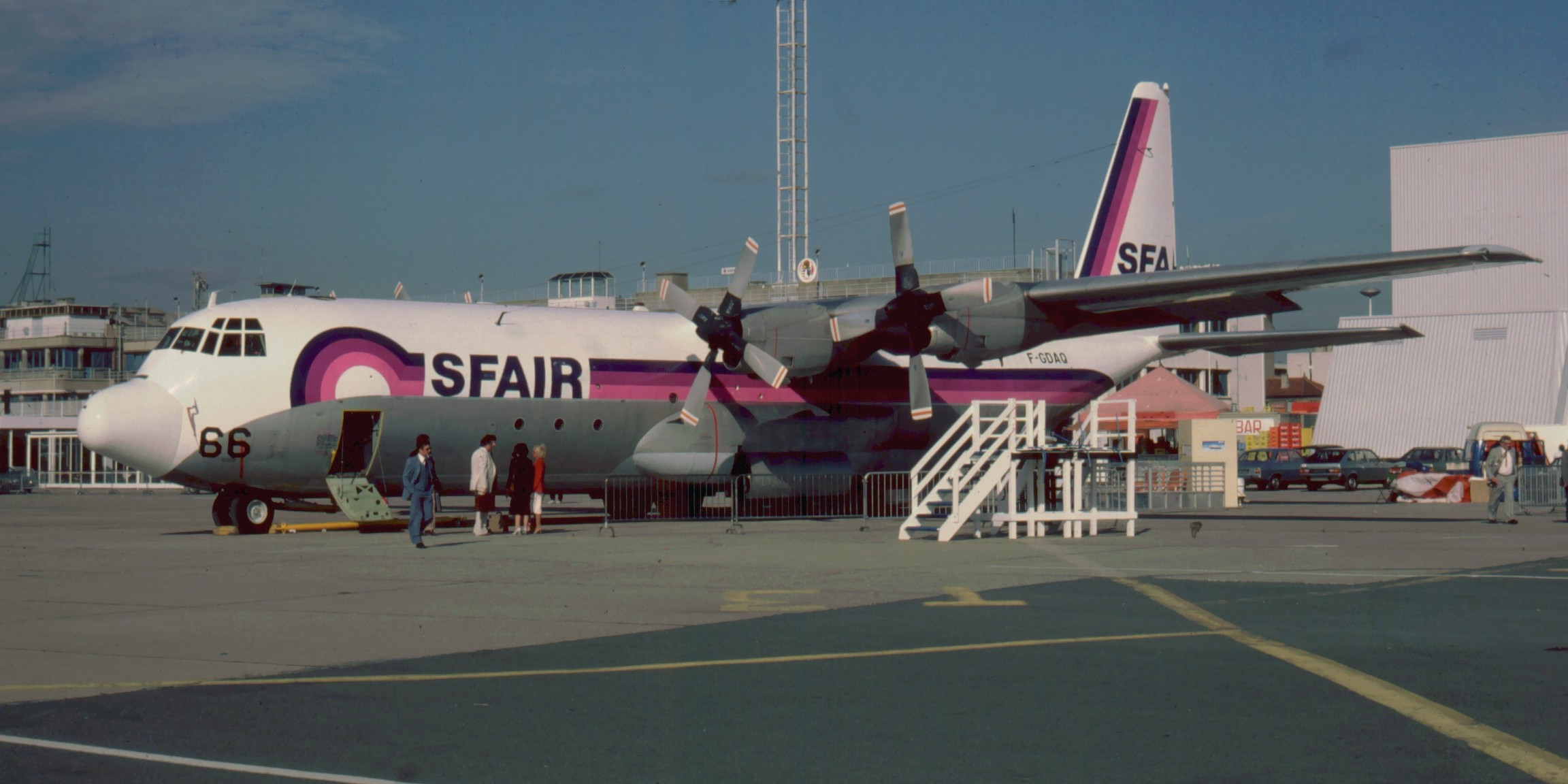
An SFAir L-100

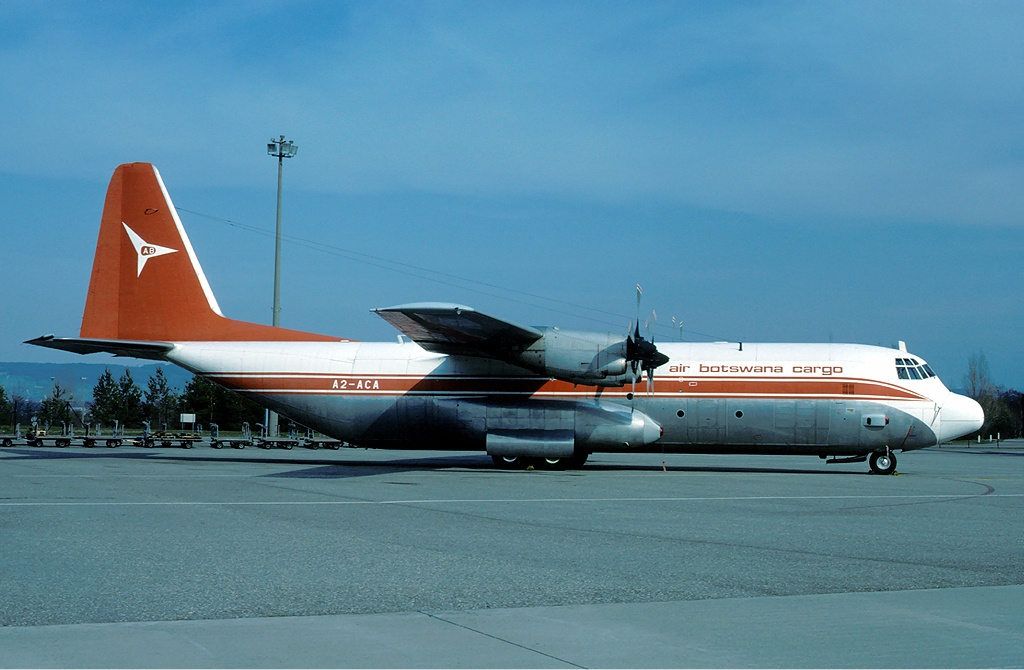
Air Botswana Basel 1984

Civilian variants are equivalent to the C-130E model without pylon tanks, side and front windows under the main windshield or military equipment.

L-100 (Model 382)
One prototype powered by four Allison 501-D22s and first flown in 1964
L-100 (Model 382B)
Production variant
L-100-20 (Model 382E and Model 382F)
Stretched variant certified in 1968 with a new 5 ft (1.5 m) section forward of the wing and 3 ft 4 in (1.02 m) section aft of the wing.
L-100-30 (Model 382G)
A further stretched variant with an additional 6 ft 8 in (2.03 m) fuselage section.
L-100M-30 (Model 382G)
A Military Conversion of L-100 With Stretched 6 ft 8 in (2.03 m) fuselage section.
LM-100J (Model 382J)
An updated civilian version of the military C-130J-30 model.
L-400 Twin Hercules
A twin-engine variant of the C-130. It was advertised in at least one publication that it would have "more than 90% parts commonality" with the standard C-130. The aircraft was shelved in the mid-1980s without any being built.

== Operators ==
=== Civilian operators ===
As of March 2011, a total of 36 Lockheed L-100 Hercules aircraft were in commercial service. Operators at that time included Lynden Air Cargo (10), Transafrik (5), Libyan Arab Air Cargo (3), and other operators with fewer aircraft.

=== Past civilian operators ===
Past operators include Delta Air Lines, which owned three L-100 aircraft that were assigned to their cargo division during the late 1960s and early 1970s. The April 27, 1969 Delta system timetable listed scheduled L-100 cargo flights with service to Atlanta (ATL), Charlotte (CLT), Chicago (ORD), Dallas (served via Love Field, DAL), Los Angeles (LAX), Memphis (MEM), Miami (MIA), New Orleans (MSY), New York City (served via Newark Airport, EWR), Orlando, FL (MCO) and San Francisco (SFO).

A number of other air carriers also operated L-100 aircraft on cargo services in the past including:

- Air Botswana Cargo
- Airlift International
- Alaska Airlines
- Alaska International Air (AIA)/Interior Airways/MarkAir
- Continental Air Services, Inc
- First Air
- Flying W Airways
- Merpati Airlines
- Northwest Territorial Airways (NWT Air)
- Pacific Western Airlines
- Red Dodge Aviation
- St. Lucia Airways
- Saturn Airways
- Southern Air Transport
- Transamerica Airlines
- Zimex Aviation

A passenger version of the L-100 configured with 97 coach seats was operated by Merpati Nusantara Airlines, an air carrier operating scheduled passenger services that was based in Indonesia. This version of the L-100 was modified with passenger windows.

=== Military operators ===
In May 2011, 35 Lockheed L-100s were in use with military operators, including:

- Indonesian Air Force (10 ordered, 8 current with 6 in service, 2 destroyed in accidents)
- Libyan Air Force (5)
- Algerian Air Force (3)
- Ecuadorian Air Force (1)
- Kuwait Air Force (3 – L-100-30)
- Mexican Air Force (1)
- Pakistan Air Force (2)
- Peruvian Air Force (3)
- Philippine Air Force (4)
- Saudi Arabian Airlines (3 L-100-30 for Royal Flight)

Other users with fewer aircraft.

- Gabon Air Force (2 – 1 L-100-20 and 1 L-100-30)
- United Arab Emirates Air Force (1 – L-100-30)
- Argentine Air Force (1 – L-100-30 – LV-APW, later TC-100)
- Free Libyan Air Force (1 L-100 following Libyan civil war)

== Specifications (L-100-30) ==

Data from International Directory of Civil Aircraft, Complete Encyclopedia of World Aircraft

General characteristics

- Crew: 3–4: (two pilots, navigator, flight engineer/loadmaster)
- Capacity: 51,050 lb (23,150 kg)
- Length: 112 ft 9 in (34.35 m)
- Wingspan: 132 ft 7 in (40.4 m)
- Height: 38 ft 3 in (11.66 m)
- Wing area: 1,745 sq ft (162.1 m^{2})
- Empty weight: 77,740 lb (35,260 kg)
- Max takeoff weight: 155,000 lb (70,300 kg)
- Powerplant: 4 × Allison 501-D22A turboprops, 4,510 shp (3,360 kW) each

Performance

- Maximum speed: 308 kn (354 mph, 570 km/h) at 20,000 ft (6,100 m)
- Cruise speed: 292 kn (336 mph, 541 km/h)
- Range: 1,334 nmi (1,535 mi, 2,470 km)
- Ferry range: 4,826 nmi (5,554 mi, 8,938 km)
- Service ceiling: 23,000 ft (7,000 m)
- Rate of climb: 1,830 ft/min (9.3 m/s)

== Accidents and incidents ==
- On 30 April 1968, Lockheed L-100 Hercules 64145 operated by the Pakistan Air Force broke up in turbulence near Islamabad Chaklala Air Base while carrying supplies. All 22 on board died.
- On 24 December 1968, Lockheed L-100-10 Hercules N760AL failed to go around despite poor visibility and crashed on approach to Brit-Puk No. 1, a landing strip for an oil drilling site near Prudhoe Bay, Alaska. The aircraft was on wet lease to Interior Airways, but operated by Airlift International. Of the four onboard, the flight engineer and co-pilot were killed, with the other two crew sustaining serious injuries.
- On 10 October 1970, Saturn Airways Lockheed L-100-20 Hercules N9248R became disoriented on approach to McGuire Air Force Base due to fog and glare and crashed into trees about a mile short of the runway on a flight from Wright-Patterson Air Force Base. All three crew members on board were killed. The aircraft was purchased from Airlift International the day before and was operated by Airlift crews.
- On 23 May 1974, Saturn Airways Lockheed L-100-30 Hercules N14ST was en route from Alameda, California to Indianapolis when the left wing failed due to metal fatigue, causing the aircraft to crash near Springfield, Illinois. Three crew and a Navy courier were killed and the aircraft was destroyed.
- On 4 October 1986, Southern Air Transport L-100-30 N15ST crashed at Kelly Air Force Base, Texas due to a device designed to raise the elevator not being stowed, resulting in the crew being unable to control the aircraft. All three people on board died.
- On 8 April 1987, Southern Air Transport L-100-30 N517SJ crashed due to loss of power in two engines during an attempted go-around at Travis Air Force Base, California. All five people on board died.
- On 2 September 1991, Southern Air Transport L-100-20 N521SJ was written off after hitting a mine while taxiing at Wau Airport. All five occupants survived with minor injuries.
- On 23 September 1994, a Heavylift Cargo Airlines L-100 cargo plane leased from Indonesia-based Pelita Air Service, crashed into Kowloon Bay after taking off from Kai Tak International Airport. Of the twelve on board, six were killed. The investigation found that the No. 4 engine had entered beta mode due to a cable system malfunctioned and the crew mishandled the procedure to correct the problem.
- On 25 August 2008, Philippine Air Force L-100-20 s/n 4593 of the 220th Airlift Wing crashed into the sea shortly after takeoff in Davao City. All eleven people on board were killed.
- On 20 May 2009, Indonesian Air Force L-100-30 s/n A-1325 of 31st Squadron crashed into 4 houses while on final approach to Madiun-Iswahyudi Airport. 98 of the 112 people on board were killed as well as 2 others on the ground. The wreckage of the Hercules was scattered in a rice paddy near Magetan, East Java. The plane was en route from Jakarta to Madiun.
- On 23 June 2021, Ethiopian Air Force L-100-30 MSN 5022 was destroyed in an accident near Gijet, Ethiopia. The aircraft may have been shot down by the Tigray Defense Forces.

== See also ==
Related development

- C-130 Hercules
- C-130J Super Hercules
- AC-130 Spectre/Spooky
- Lockheed DC-130
- Lockheed EC-130
- Lockheed HC-130
- Lockheed LC-130
- Lockheed MC-130
- Lockheed WC-130

Aircraft of comparable role, configuration, and era

- Antonov An-12
- Blackburn Beverley
- Shaanxi Y-8
- Transall C-160
- Short Belfast
