= Flying W Airways =

New Jersey-based airline (1967–1971)

- Founded: 1967
- Ceased operations: 1971
- Operating bases: Medford, New Jersey
- Fleet size: See Fleet below
- Headquarters: Medford, New Jersey
- Key people: James P. Whitesell
- Founder: William C. Whitesell

Red Dodge Aviation
IATA	ICAO	Call sign
—	RDG	RED-DODGE
- Founded: 1968
- Commenced operations: 1969
- Ceased operations: 1972
- Operating bases: Anchorage
- Fleet size: See Fleet below
- Headquarters: Anchorage
- Key people: William C. Whitesell; James P. Whitesell
- Founder: Earl "Red" Dodge

Flying W Airways (FWA) was a briefly high-profile publicly traded company of the late 1960s/early 1970s, which originated in 1961 when its founders opened Flying W Airport (then known as Flying W Ranch) in New Jersey as a fly-in resort (as of 2025, the airport part still operates). FWA became a bet on Alaskan oil and at its peak in 1969 attracted investment by the Matlack family (founders of one of the US's largest trucking companies), had two Hollywood actors on its board and bought Red Dodge Aviation (RDA) of Alaska, for which it acquired Lockheed L-100 Hercules aircraft (civil version of the C-130 military transport), to take advantage of forthcoming Alaska pipeline construction.

Unfortunately, pipeline construction was unexpectedly delayed, and highly levered FWA (and RDA) quickly went bankrupt. RDA operated a year and a half in bankruptcy before a Federal judge shut it down. The judge noted the main shareholders had been infected with a Klondike-like fever relative to Alaska oil that induced them to personally guarantee the aircraft financings. The then-shuttered airport was sold in bankruptcy but re-opened in 1984 under new owners.

== History ==
=== Flying W Ranch ===
Former Eastern Air Lines pilot William (Bill) Whitesell and his brother James opened the airport (then called Flying W Ranch) in 1961. It billed itself "the most unusual resort in the U.S." and a "Texas-style ranch in New Jersey"; ramp personnel dressed as cowboys and guests stayed at the Ponderosa Lodge. By 1968, they added a small airline, Flying W Airways (FWA), operating C-46 freighters (see External links for a photo) and smaller aircraft. A newspaper noted the change in focus from hospitality to business. Whitesell repurposed an existing public company as the airline, giving Flying W a share price. At the time, the Civil Aeronautics Board (CAB), a now-defunct Federal agency, tightly regulated almost all US air transport. FWA sidestepped the CAB by being a contract or uncertificated carrier that only offered services on a privately contracted basis (not a common carrier). In 1969, FWA pivoted again. It sold the C-46s and bought Red Dodge Aviation (RDA) of Alaska. FWA ordered Hercules aircraft for RDA. RDA would contract with oil companies.

=== Alaskan oil ===
In early 1968, oil was discovered on Alaska's North Slope (facing the Arctic Ocean), which became Prudhoe Bay Oil Field. There were then no roads on the North Slope; exploration depended entirely on air transport. Entire drilling rigs, accommodation blocks for workers, bulldozers, food and even diesel fuel were flown in, in temperatures that could be negative 40 or worse. The key aircraft was the Hercules, which could fly large loads into small gravel airstrips and had its own rear loading ramp. Bulldozers could drive on and off. External links has a brief color film of a competitor airline flying a Hercules to the North Slope. The pipeline phase promised even more Hercules demand.

Pipeline was the only feasible way to get this oil to market. Building the pipeline was widely expected to start in 1970, but native Alaskans and environmentalists forced a delay, the former by negotiating for use of their lands and the latter by leveraging the newly passed National Environmental Policy Act (NEPA), which required the writing of a lengthy environmental impact statement. Litigation lingered until Congress acted in the wake of the 1973 energy crisis and got things moving in early 1974.

=== Red Dodge ===
Earl "Red" Dodge (1926–2004) was a Western Air Lines pilot with Alaska aviation side-businesses. He owned a P-51, painted pink, which he contracted out as a fire-spotting aircraft. He had B-25s that dropped fire retardant and in the late 1960s, he converted a small fleet of Lockheed Constellations to transport diesel fuel to the North Slope. The Federal Aviation Administration prosecuted him for that, because he didn't bother to obtain commercial operational authority, but the jury refused to convict. RDA combined his expertise with FWA money.

=== Bankruptcy ===
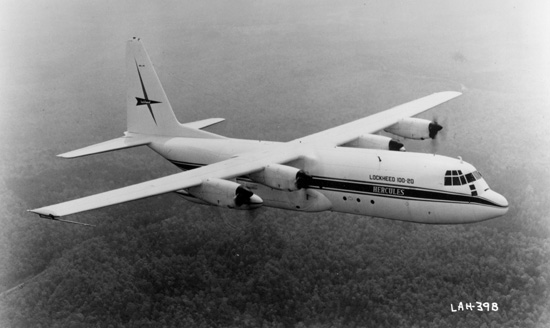
L-100-20 Hercules prototype, which flew briefly as RDA's third L-100, N50FW

FWA flew its first Hercules delivery to Flying W Airport for an April 1969 meeting of the board, which included Hollywood actors Bob Cummings and Robert Montgomery. The presence of a large aircraft at a small airport, with celebrities, got press. Shortly thereafter the board chair became Robert Matlack, reflecting a controlling interest now held by him and his brothers Edwin and Brooke. The family money was from Matlack, Inc., one of the largest US tanker truck companies, which coincidently called itself a "pipeline on wheels."

By early 1970, RDA had three Hercules (External links has photos of FWA/RDA Hercules). But as indicated above, Alaska oil development suddenly halted and Hercules demand did not materialize. FWA was highly leveraged and filed for bankruptcy, along with RDA, in September 1970. FWA/RDA operated in bankruptcy until February 1972, when a Federal judge stripped RDA of its two remaining aircraft noting there wasn't work enough for even one Hercules, no expert was willing to testify as to when the pipeline moratorium would end, and no credible party had emerged to reorganize the airline. The stakes, the judge noted, were extremely high as "[i]nfected, as it were, by the exuberant Klondike-like spirit which gripped Alaska" the main shareholders had backed the aircraft financings with personal guarantees (in the case of the Matlacks, that of the family holding company).

Also stranded was RDA's Anchorage hangar, which would have been the only one in Alaska capable of accommodating a Hercules, left partially built since filing. Flying W Airport, no longer operational, was sold in bankruptcy July 1971 and did not operate again until 1984. RDA competitor Interior Airways filed for bankruptcy due to its own Hercules commitment, but survived, fully paying creditors. Alaska Airlines, which pioneered the use of the Hercules in Alaska in 1965 and which had four in its fleet at year-end 1970, exited the Hercules business by 1972.

== Fleet ==
Flying W Airways, 17 November 1968:

- 7 Curtiss C-46
- 5 Twin Beech
- 1 Convair 580
- 1 Learjet 23

Red Dodge Aviation:^{(1)}

- 2 Lockheed L-100-20 Hercules

(1) FAA records for year-end 1969, 1970 and 1971 reflect two Hercules at RDA. For a brief period at the beginning of 1970, RDA operated a third, N50FW, the L-100-20 prototype. FWA had options on a further two. N50FW had a structural defect requiring its return to Lockheed in April 1970. Thereafter RDA operated two Hercules.

== Incidents and accidents ==
- May 7, 1969: Two pilots were killed when Flying W Airways Curtiss C-46F-1-CU N1243N crashed into trees on takeoff from Flying W Airport on a flight to Allentown, PA. The captain was not typed for the C-46 and the aircraft swerved on takeoff, heading toward parked aircraft; the tailwheel was found to be unlocked. To avoid hitting parked aircraft, the crew took off prematurely, hitting trees.

== See also ==
- List of defunct airlines of the United States
