= 2017 New Jersey helicopter crash =

Helicopter crash killing Troy Gentry

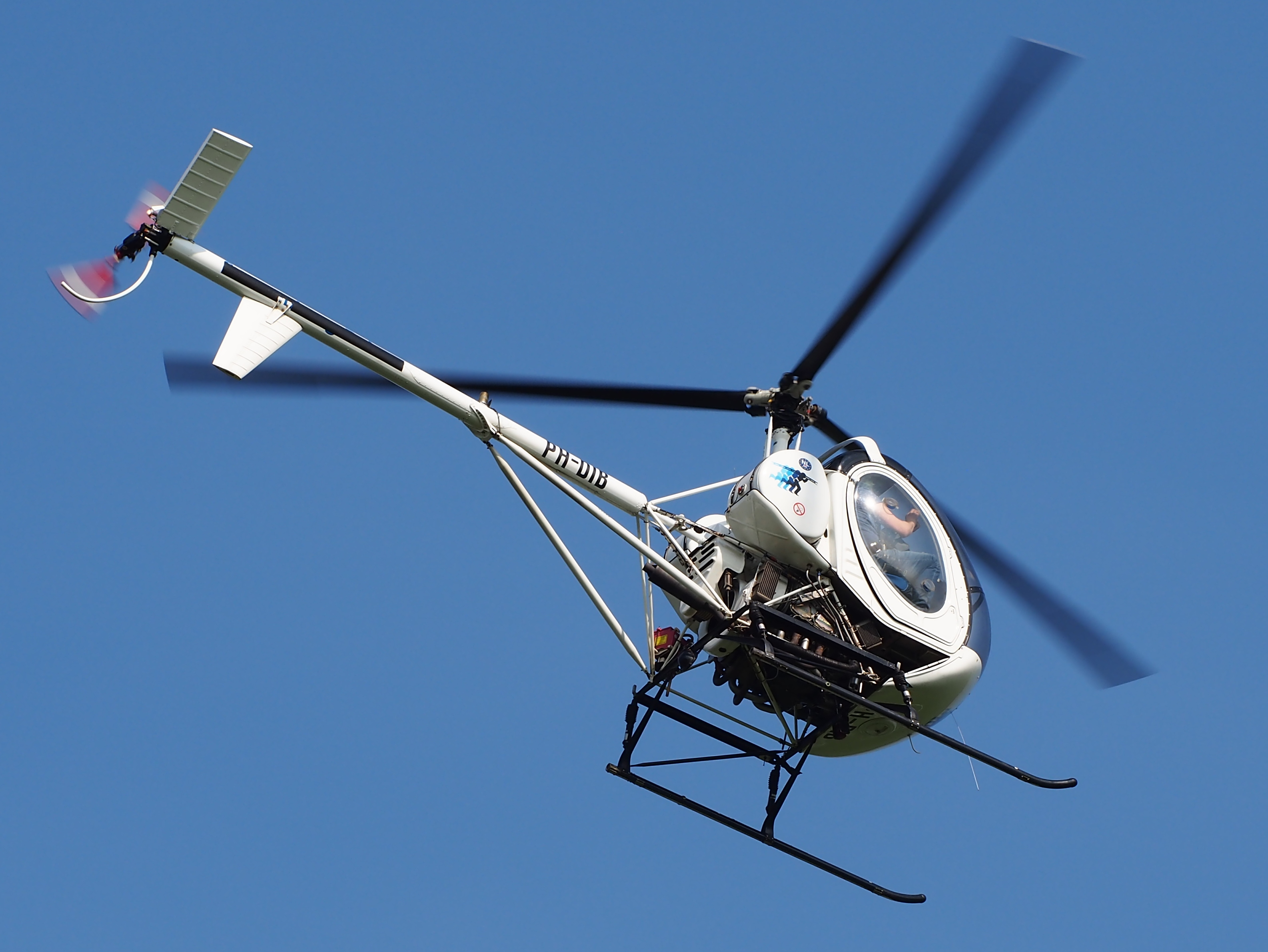
- A Schweizer 269C similar to the accident aircraft

Accident
- Date: 8 September 2017
- Summary: Loss of control, hard landing
- Site: Medford, New Jersey, U.S.; 39.9289°N 74.8066°W

Aircraft
- Aircraft type: Schweizer 269C-1
- Operator: Helicopter Flight Services
- Registration: N204HF
- Flight origin: Flying W Airport
- Occupants: 2
- Passengers: 1
- Crew: 1
- Fatalities: 2
- Survivors: 0

On 8 September 2017, a Schweizer 269C helicopter crashed after an uncontrolled descent during a power-off landing attempt at the Flying W Airport in Medford, New Jersey, United States. The aircraft had experienced engine trouble during a local sightseeing flight for the benefit of passenger Troy Gentry, cofounder and member of American country music duo Montgomery Gentry, which was scheduled to perform at a resort at the airport later that day. The pilot died at the scene; Gentry was pronounced dead after being taken to a hospital.

== Aircraft ==
The accident aircraft was a Schweizer 269C-1 helicopter, Federal Aviation Administration (FAA) aircraft registration number N204HF, serial number 0109, manufactured in 2000, with 7899.2 total aircraft hours logged at the time of the accident. It was owned by Herlihy Helicopters, Inc. and operated by Helicopter Flight Services, an FAA Part 141 flight school. The craft had passed its most recent 100-hour inspection on 17 August 2017, at 7,884 total aircraft hours, a mere 15 aircraft hours prior to the accident. The aircraft was equipped with a 180 horsepower (130 kW) Lycoming HO-360-C1A engine.

== Crash ==
The company flight instructor stated that the purpose of the flight was to provide orientation and pleasure for Gentry, who was scheduled to perform at the airport in the evening. During the flight, the pilot reported over UNICOM that manipulating the twist-grip engine control had no effect on engine rpm, and he elected to prepare for a precautionary landing. At 12:40 EDT (16:40 UTC), local police received a call that a helicopter was in distress, and officers arrived at the airport a short time later. At approximately 13:00 EDT, the pilot shut off the engine and initiated a power-off descent under autorotation from approximately 950 feet (290 m) above ground level; however, as the descent proceeded, vertical speed became excessive. The aircraft impacted the ground about 220 feet (67 m) south of and in line with Runway 01, leaving a 10 feet (3.0 m) ground scar; the impact substantially deformed the passenger cabin and separated the tail boom from the aircraft. The pilot was trapped in the wreckage and pronounced dead at the scene; passenger Gentry died of his injuries after being taken to Virtua Hospital Marlton.

== Passengers and crew ==
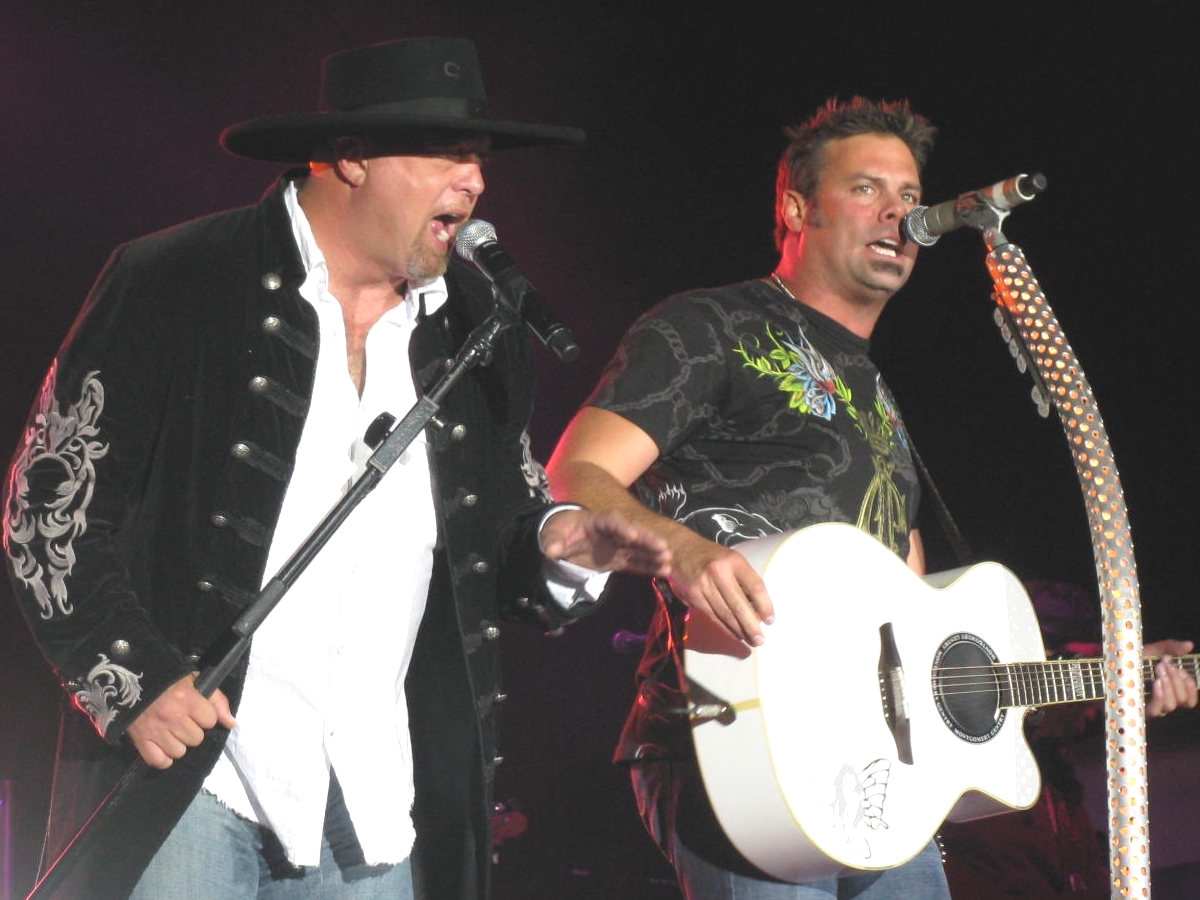
Troy Gentry (right) at the Gretna Heritage Festival in 2008

The aircraft carried two occupants: passenger Troy Gentry, one-half of the country music duo Montgomery Gentry, and the pilot. The pilot had logged 480.9 total hours of flight experience, of which about 300 hours were in a Schweizer 269 or similar aircraft, and he had logged 1.2 hours in the accident helicopter earlier that day. He held both commercial and flight instructor pilot certificates.

== Investigation ==
The FAA and National Transportation Safety Board (NTSB) immediately began investigations of the accident. On 13 September 2017, the NTSB announced preliminary findings, reporting that the helicopter had experienced engine trouble and that the rotor blades had slowed significantly before the aircraft impacted the ground.

Investigators found that after the pilot reported that the engine was not responding to throttle inputs, he consulted with a company flight instructor and a Designated Pilot Examiner, who both attempted to convince him to perform a shallow run-on landing; however, he decided to perform a power-off landing under autorotation, as this was more familiar to him. Despite being advised "multiple times" to aim for "midfield" and not to initiate the descent until over the runway, he initiated autorotation significantly south of the runway. As the descent progressed, the flight instructor reported that vertical speed became excessive and forward speed became inadequate, and that the rotors appeared as individual rotating blades rather than a "translucent disc," indicative of decaying rotor rpm. A video recorded by police likewise showed vertical speed increasing and horizontal speed decreasing as the descent proceeded. A post-crash examination revealed that the rotor blades suffered little to no damage along their respective spans toward the blade tips, which is consistent with low rotor rpm on impact.

The throttle tie rod assembly was found separated at the threaded joint, and although it was contaminated by debris from the impact crater, cleaning and close examination of the tie rod threads revealed damage consistent with vibratory thread-to-thread wear. Investigators determined that a new throttle control cable had been installed on 31 August 2016 and that it had been most recently inspected on 17 August 2017. Additionally, the engine had been changed in 2011, and the carburetor had been changed in 2014. According to the aircraft maintenance manual, throttle rigging should be performed whenever the throttle control cable, engine, and/or carburetor is changed; however, the mechanic stated that he was "not 100 percent [sure]" that this had been done when the engine was changed, and he claimed that "no adjustments were necessary to achieve/maintain proper rigging" when changing the cable.

The NTSB report quotes other documents warning against the excessive application of collective pitch during autorotation, stating that it could "result in a hard landing with corresponding damage to the helicopter" and that it should "never be applied to reduce rpm for extending glide distance."

The accident was attributed to "The pilot's early entry into and failure to maintain rotor rpm during a forced landing autorotation after performing an engine shutdown in flight, which resulted in an uncontrolled descent. Contributing to the accident was the failure of maintenance personnel to properly rig the throttle control tie-rod assembly, which resulted in an in-flight separation of the assembly and rendered control of engine rpm impossible."
