= Lynden Air Cargo =

Alaskan cargo airline

IATA	ICAO	Call sign
L2	LYC	LYNDEN
- Founded: 1995
- AOC #: LR7A113H
- Hubs: Ted Stevens Anchorage International Airport
- Fleet size: 10
- Headquarters: Anchorage, Alaska, United States
- Website: https://www.lynden.com/lac/

Lynden Air Cargo is an American cargo airline based in Anchorage, Alaska. It operates scheduled services and on demand charter, international and domestic flights, including services for the US military. Its main base is Ted Stevens Anchorage International Airport.

== History ==
The airline was established in 1995 and started operations on 31 August 1995. It began operation of Lockheed L-382 Hercules aircraft in 1997. It has 140 employees. The company has a Civil Reserve Air Fleet contract with the United States Department of Defense.

== Destinations ==
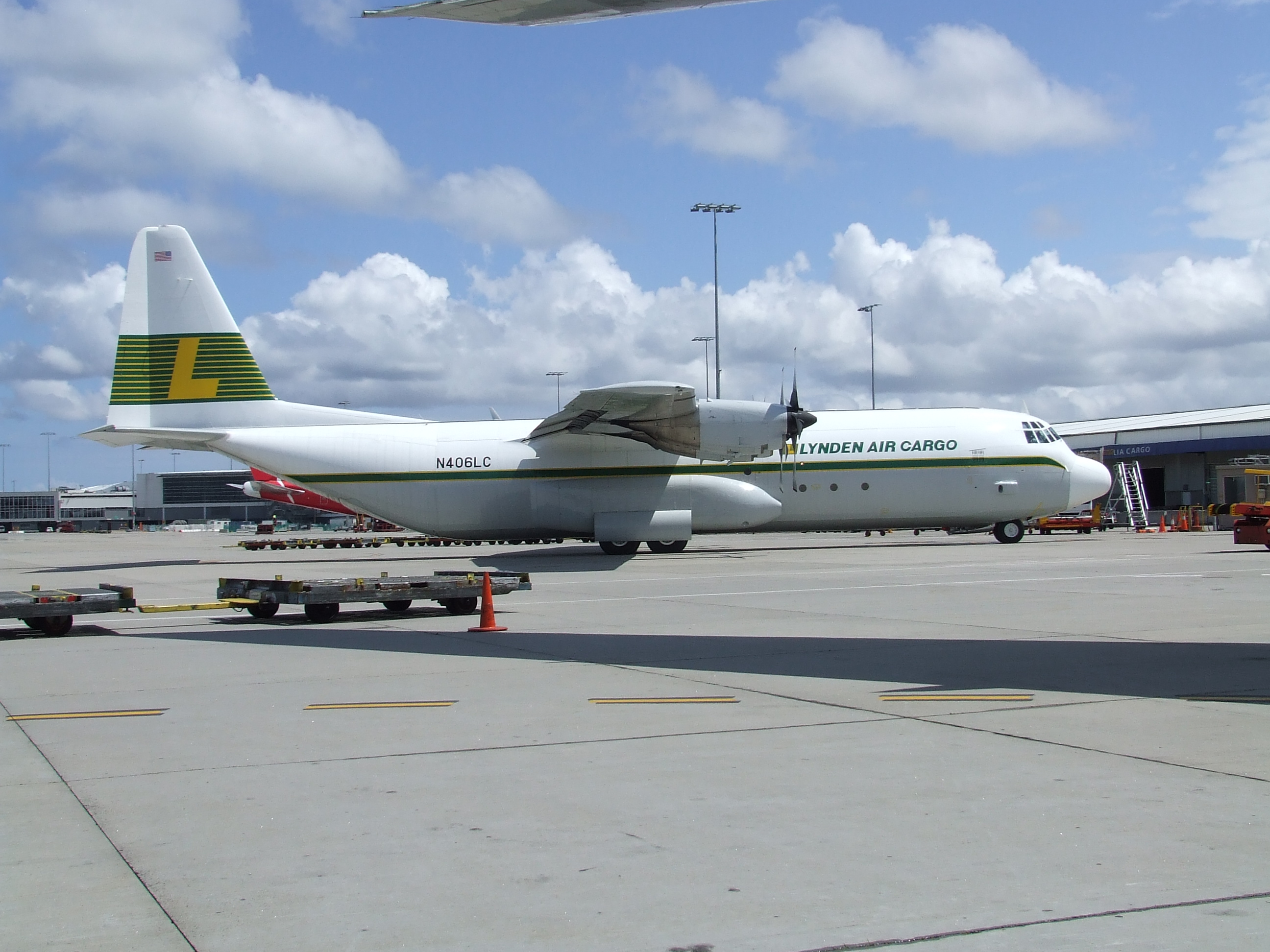
Lynden Air Cargo Lockheed L-382 Hercules parked at Sydney Airport in Australia

Lynden Air Cargo operates the following domestic scheduled freight services: Anchorage, Bethel, Kotzebue and Nome.
